

146001–146100 

|-bgcolor=#fefefe
| 146001 ||  || — || February 2, 2000 || Socorro || LINEAR || NYS || align=right | 1.1 km || 
|-id=002 bgcolor=#fefefe
| 146002 ||  || — || February 2, 2000 || Socorro || LINEAR || V || align=right | 1.3 km || 
|-id=003 bgcolor=#fefefe
| 146003 ||  || — || February 2, 2000 || Socorro || LINEAR || NYS || align=right | 1.4 km || 
|-id=004 bgcolor=#fefefe
| 146004 ||  || — || February 4, 2000 || Socorro || LINEAR || — || align=right | 1.4 km || 
|-id=005 bgcolor=#fefefe
| 146005 ||  || — || February 4, 2000 || Socorro || LINEAR || NYS || align=right | 1.2 km || 
|-id=006 bgcolor=#fefefe
| 146006 ||  || — || February 3, 2000 || Socorro || LINEAR || — || align=right | 2.9 km || 
|-id=007 bgcolor=#fefefe
| 146007 ||  || — || February 6, 2000 || Socorro || LINEAR || ERI || align=right | 3.5 km || 
|-id=008 bgcolor=#fefefe
| 146008 ||  || — || February 2, 2000 || Uenohara || N. Kawasato || NYS || align=right | 1.0 km || 
|-id=009 bgcolor=#fefefe
| 146009 ||  || — || February 10, 2000 || Višnjan Observatory || K. Korlević || MAS || align=right | 1.4 km || 
|-id=010 bgcolor=#fefefe
| 146010 ||  || — || February 8, 2000 || Kitt Peak || Spacewatch || FLO || align=right | 1.1 km || 
|-id=011 bgcolor=#fefefe
| 146011 ||  || — || February 4, 2000 || Socorro || LINEAR || NYS || align=right | 1.2 km || 
|-id=012 bgcolor=#E9E9E9
| 146012 ||  || — || February 4, 2000 || Socorro || LINEAR || — || align=right | 2.3 km || 
|-id=013 bgcolor=#fefefe
| 146013 ||  || — || February 8, 2000 || Kitt Peak || Spacewatch || — || align=right data-sort-value="0.96" | 960 m || 
|-id=014 bgcolor=#d6d6d6
| 146014 ||  || — || February 12, 2000 || Socorro || LINEAR || HIL3:2 || align=right | 13 km || 
|-id=015 bgcolor=#fefefe
| 146015 ||  || — || February 6, 2000 || Socorro || LINEAR || — || align=right | 1.5 km || 
|-id=016 bgcolor=#fefefe
| 146016 ||  || — || February 1, 2000 || Catalina || CSS || NYS || align=right | 1.1 km || 
|-id=017 bgcolor=#fefefe
| 146017 ||  || — || February 5, 2000 || San Marcello || A. Boattini, L. Tesi || — || align=right | 1.4 km || 
|-id=018 bgcolor=#fefefe
| 146018 ||  || — || February 2, 2000 || Socorro || LINEAR || NYS || align=right | 1.2 km || 
|-id=019 bgcolor=#fefefe
| 146019 ||  || — || February 5, 2000 || Kitt Peak || Spacewatch || EUT || align=right data-sort-value="0.97" | 970 m || 
|-id=020 bgcolor=#fefefe
| 146020 ||  || — || February 5, 2000 || Kitt Peak || Spacewatch || FLO || align=right data-sort-value="0.96" | 960 m || 
|-id=021 bgcolor=#fefefe
| 146021 ||  || — || February 28, 2000 || Socorro || LINEAR || — || align=right | 1.5 km || 
|-id=022 bgcolor=#fefefe
| 146022 ||  || — || February 28, 2000 || Socorro || LINEAR || NYS || align=right | 1.3 km || 
|-id=023 bgcolor=#fefefe
| 146023 ||  || — || February 29, 2000 || Socorro || LINEAR || NYS || align=right | 1.5 km || 
|-id=024 bgcolor=#fefefe
| 146024 ||  || — || February 29, 2000 || Socorro || LINEAR || — || align=right | 1.4 km || 
|-id=025 bgcolor=#fefefe
| 146025 ||  || — || February 29, 2000 || Socorro || LINEAR || MAS || align=right | 1.1 km || 
|-id=026 bgcolor=#fefefe
| 146026 ||  || — || February 29, 2000 || Socorro || LINEAR || — || align=right | 2.1 km || 
|-id=027 bgcolor=#fefefe
| 146027 ||  || — || February 29, 2000 || Socorro || LINEAR || MAS || align=right | 1.1 km || 
|-id=028 bgcolor=#fefefe
| 146028 ||  || — || February 29, 2000 || Socorro || LINEAR || NYS || align=right | 2.3 km || 
|-id=029 bgcolor=#fefefe
| 146029 ||  || — || February 29, 2000 || Socorro || LINEAR || NYS || align=right | 1.3 km || 
|-id=030 bgcolor=#fefefe
| 146030 ||  || — || February 29, 2000 || Socorro || LINEAR || — || align=right | 1.1 km || 
|-id=031 bgcolor=#fefefe
| 146031 ||  || — || February 29, 2000 || Socorro || LINEAR || NYS || align=right | 1.2 km || 
|-id=032 bgcolor=#fefefe
| 146032 ||  || — || February 29, 2000 || Socorro || LINEAR || — || align=right | 1.3 km || 
|-id=033 bgcolor=#fefefe
| 146033 ||  || — || February 28, 2000 || Socorro || LINEAR || FLO || align=right | 1.3 km || 
|-id=034 bgcolor=#fefefe
| 146034 ||  || — || February 29, 2000 || Socorro || LINEAR || — || align=right | 1.5 km || 
|-id=035 bgcolor=#d6d6d6
| 146035 ||  || — || February 29, 2000 || Socorro || LINEAR || HIL3:2 || align=right | 10 km || 
|-id=036 bgcolor=#fefefe
| 146036 ||  || — || February 26, 2000 || Kitt Peak || Spacewatch || — || align=right | 1.4 km || 
|-id=037 bgcolor=#fefefe
| 146037 ||  || — || February 28, 2000 || Socorro || LINEAR || — || align=right | 1.6 km || 
|-id=038 bgcolor=#fefefe
| 146038 ||  || — || February 29, 2000 || Socorro || LINEAR || V || align=right | 1.1 km || 
|-id=039 bgcolor=#fefefe
| 146039 ||  || — || February 28, 2000 || Socorro || LINEAR || NYS || align=right | 1.4 km || 
|-id=040 bgcolor=#fefefe
| 146040 Alicebowman ||  ||  || February 27, 2000 || Kitt Peak || M. W. Buie || — || align=right | 1.2 km || 
|-id=041 bgcolor=#fefefe
| 146041 ||  || — || March 3, 2000 || Socorro || LINEAR || NYS || align=right data-sort-value="0.99" | 990 m || 
|-id=042 bgcolor=#fefefe
| 146042 ||  || — || March 2, 2000 || Kitt Peak || Spacewatch || MAS || align=right | 1.5 km || 
|-id=043 bgcolor=#fefefe
| 146043 ||  || — || March 2, 2000 || Višnjan Observatory || K. Korlević || — || align=right | 1.5 km || 
|-id=044 bgcolor=#fefefe
| 146044 ||  || — || March 3, 2000 || Socorro || LINEAR || NYS || align=right | 1.1 km || 
|-id=045 bgcolor=#E9E9E9
| 146045 ||  || — || March 4, 2000 || Socorro || LINEAR || — || align=right | 3.0 km || 
|-id=046 bgcolor=#fefefe
| 146046 ||  || — || March 5, 2000 || Socorro || LINEAR || NYS || align=right | 1.3 km || 
|-id=047 bgcolor=#fefefe
| 146047 ||  || — || March 3, 2000 || Socorro || LINEAR || NYS || align=right | 1.1 km || 
|-id=048 bgcolor=#fefefe
| 146048 ||  || — || March 4, 2000 || Socorro || LINEAR || — || align=right | 2.8 km || 
|-id=049 bgcolor=#E9E9E9
| 146049 ||  || — || March 5, 2000 || Socorro || LINEAR || — || align=right | 3.6 km || 
|-id=050 bgcolor=#fefefe
| 146050 ||  || — || March 9, 2000 || Socorro || LINEAR || V || align=right | 1.2 km || 
|-id=051 bgcolor=#fefefe
| 146051 ||  || — || March 5, 2000 || Socorro || LINEAR || — || align=right | 1.9 km || 
|-id=052 bgcolor=#fefefe
| 146052 ||  || — || March 8, 2000 || Socorro || LINEAR || — || align=right | 3.4 km || 
|-id=053 bgcolor=#fefefe
| 146053 ||  || — || March 12, 2000 || Socorro || LINEAR || V || align=right | 1.5 km || 
|-id=054 bgcolor=#E9E9E9
| 146054 ||  || — || March 12, 2000 || Kitt Peak || Spacewatch || — || align=right | 1.9 km || 
|-id=055 bgcolor=#fefefe
| 146055 ||  || — || March 9, 2000 || Kvistaberg || UDAS || NYS || align=right | 1.0 km || 
|-id=056 bgcolor=#fefefe
| 146056 ||  || — || March 11, 2000 || Anderson Mesa || LONEOS || NYS || align=right | 1.1 km || 
|-id=057 bgcolor=#fefefe
| 146057 ||  || — || March 7, 2000 || Socorro || LINEAR || — || align=right | 2.0 km || 
|-id=058 bgcolor=#E9E9E9
| 146058 ||  || — || March 5, 2000 || Socorro || LINEAR || — || align=right | 3.5 km || 
|-id=059 bgcolor=#E9E9E9
| 146059 ||  || — || March 4, 2000 || Socorro || LINEAR || KON || align=right | 4.4 km || 
|-id=060 bgcolor=#E9E9E9
| 146060 ||  || — || March 3, 2000 || Socorro || LINEAR || — || align=right | 1.7 km || 
|-id=061 bgcolor=#E9E9E9
| 146061 ||  || — || March 29, 2000 || Kitt Peak || Spacewatch || — || align=right | 1.4 km || 
|-id=062 bgcolor=#fefefe
| 146062 ||  || — || March 29, 2000 || Socorro || LINEAR || NYS || align=right | 1.3 km || 
|-id=063 bgcolor=#E9E9E9
| 146063 ||  || — || March 29, 2000 || Kitt Peak || Spacewatch || — || align=right | 2.3 km || 
|-id=064 bgcolor=#fefefe
| 146064 ||  || — || March 26, 2000 || Anderson Mesa || LONEOS || — || align=right | 1.6 km || 
|-id=065 bgcolor=#E9E9E9
| 146065 ||  || — || March 29, 2000 || Socorro || LINEAR || ADE || align=right | 3.0 km || 
|-id=066 bgcolor=#E9E9E9
| 146066 ||  || — || March 29, 2000 || Socorro || LINEAR || — || align=right | 3.0 km || 
|-id=067 bgcolor=#fefefe
| 146067 ||  || — || April 5, 2000 || Socorro || LINEAR || NYS || align=right | 1.3 km || 
|-id=068 bgcolor=#fefefe
| 146068 ||  || — || April 5, 2000 || Socorro || LINEAR || — || align=right | 1.2 km || 
|-id=069 bgcolor=#E9E9E9
| 146069 ||  || — || April 3, 2000 || Socorro || LINEAR || — || align=right | 2.0 km || 
|-id=070 bgcolor=#fefefe
| 146070 ||  || — || April 4, 2000 || Socorro || LINEAR || — || align=right | 1.8 km || 
|-id=071 bgcolor=#E9E9E9
| 146071 ||  || — || April 4, 2000 || Socorro || LINEAR || — || align=right | 3.1 km || 
|-id=072 bgcolor=#E9E9E9
| 146072 ||  || — || April 4, 2000 || Socorro || LINEAR || — || align=right | 1.8 km || 
|-id=073 bgcolor=#E9E9E9
| 146073 ||  || — || April 5, 2000 || Socorro || LINEAR || GER || align=right | 2.7 km || 
|-id=074 bgcolor=#E9E9E9
| 146074 ||  || — || April 3, 2000 || Anderson Mesa || LONEOS || — || align=right | 1.6 km || 
|-id=075 bgcolor=#fefefe
| 146075 ||  || — || April 8, 2000 || Socorro || LINEAR || ERI || align=right | 3.5 km || 
|-id=076 bgcolor=#fefefe
| 146076 ||  || — || April 7, 2000 || Anderson Mesa || LONEOS || — || align=right | 2.9 km || 
|-id=077 bgcolor=#E9E9E9
| 146077 ||  || — || April 7, 2000 || Socorro || LINEAR || — || align=right | 1.3 km || 
|-id=078 bgcolor=#fefefe
| 146078 ||  || — || April 3, 2000 || Anderson Mesa || LONEOS || NYS || align=right | 1.3 km || 
|-id=079 bgcolor=#fefefe
| 146079 ||  || — || April 3, 2000 || Kitt Peak || Spacewatch || — || align=right | 1.5 km || 
|-id=080 bgcolor=#E9E9E9
| 146080 ||  || — || April 26, 2000 || Kitt Peak || Spacewatch || — || align=right | 1.8 km || 
|-id=081 bgcolor=#fefefe
| 146081 ||  || — || April 27, 2000 || Socorro || LINEAR || — || align=right | 1.7 km || 
|-id=082 bgcolor=#E9E9E9
| 146082 ||  || — || April 28, 2000 || Socorro || LINEAR || — || align=right | 2.1 km || 
|-id=083 bgcolor=#fefefe
| 146083 ||  || — || April 29, 2000 || Socorro || LINEAR || NYS || align=right | 1.2 km || 
|-id=084 bgcolor=#fefefe
| 146084 ||  || — || April 25, 2000 || Kitt Peak || Spacewatch || NYS || align=right | 2.5 km || 
|-id=085 bgcolor=#E9E9E9
| 146085 ||  || — || April 27, 2000 || Anderson Mesa || LONEOS || — || align=right | 1.3 km || 
|-id=086 bgcolor=#E9E9E9
| 146086 ||  || — || May 1, 2000 || Kitt Peak || Spacewatch || — || align=right | 2.3 km || 
|-id=087 bgcolor=#fefefe
| 146087 ||  || — || May 6, 2000 || Socorro || LINEAR || NYS || align=right | 1.2 km || 
|-id=088 bgcolor=#fefefe
| 146088 ||  || — || May 7, 2000 || Socorro || LINEAR || NYS || align=right | 1.6 km || 
|-id=089 bgcolor=#E9E9E9
| 146089 ||  || — || May 27, 2000 || Socorro || LINEAR || — || align=right | 3.4 km || 
|-id=090 bgcolor=#E9E9E9
| 146090 ||  || — || May 28, 2000 || Socorro || LINEAR || — || align=right | 1.5 km || 
|-id=091 bgcolor=#E9E9E9
| 146091 ||  || — || May 27, 2000 || Socorro || LINEAR || — || align=right | 2.7 km || 
|-id=092 bgcolor=#E9E9E9
| 146092 ||  || — || May 25, 2000 || Kitt Peak || Spacewatch || — || align=right | 1.4 km || 
|-id=093 bgcolor=#E9E9E9
| 146093 ||  || — || May 25, 2000 || Kitt Peak || Spacewatch || — || align=right | 1.8 km || 
|-id=094 bgcolor=#fefefe
| 146094 ||  || — || May 24, 2000 || Anderson Mesa || LONEOS || — || align=right | 1.6 km || 
|-id=095 bgcolor=#E9E9E9
| 146095 ||  || — || July 23, 2000 || Socorro || LINEAR || EUN || align=right | 2.3 km || 
|-id=096 bgcolor=#d6d6d6
| 146096 ||  || — || July 23, 2000 || Socorro || LINEAR || — || align=right | 4.2 km || 
|-id=097 bgcolor=#d6d6d6
| 146097 ||  || — || August 2, 2000 || Socorro || LINEAR || — || align=right | 7.0 km || 
|-id=098 bgcolor=#E9E9E9
| 146098 ||  || — || August 3, 2000 || Socorro || LINEAR || — || align=right | 5.8 km || 
|-id=099 bgcolor=#d6d6d6
| 146099 ||  || — || August 4, 2000 || Haleakala || NEAT || — || align=right | 8.5 km || 
|-id=100 bgcolor=#d6d6d6
| 146100 ||  || — || August 5, 2000 || Haleakala || NEAT || — || align=right | 6.3 km || 
|}

146101–146200 

|-bgcolor=#d6d6d6
| 146101 ||  || — || August 24, 2000 || Socorro || LINEAR || EUP || align=right | 10 km || 
|-id=102 bgcolor=#E9E9E9
| 146102 ||  || — || August 25, 2000 || Črni Vrh || Črni Vrh || DOR || align=right | 5.6 km || 
|-id=103 bgcolor=#E9E9E9
| 146103 ||  || — || August 24, 2000 || Socorro || LINEAR || — || align=right | 2.5 km || 
|-id=104 bgcolor=#d6d6d6
| 146104 ||  || — || August 24, 2000 || Socorro || LINEAR || EOS || align=right | 3.5 km || 
|-id=105 bgcolor=#d6d6d6
| 146105 ||  || — || August 24, 2000 || Socorro || LINEAR || — || align=right | 4.6 km || 
|-id=106 bgcolor=#d6d6d6
| 146106 ||  || — || August 24, 2000 || Socorro || LINEAR || — || align=right | 4.5 km || 
|-id=107 bgcolor=#d6d6d6
| 146107 ||  || — || August 25, 2000 || Socorro || LINEAR || — || align=right | 5.6 km || 
|-id=108 bgcolor=#fefefe
| 146108 ||  || — || August 28, 2000 || Socorro || LINEAR || H || align=right | 1.4 km || 
|-id=109 bgcolor=#d6d6d6
| 146109 ||  || — || August 29, 2000 || Socorro || LINEAR || — || align=right | 4.2 km || 
|-id=110 bgcolor=#d6d6d6
| 146110 ||  || — || August 28, 2000 || Socorro || LINEAR || EUP || align=right | 11 km || 
|-id=111 bgcolor=#d6d6d6
| 146111 ||  || — || August 31, 2000 || Socorro || LINEAR || — || align=right | 2.6 km || 
|-id=112 bgcolor=#E9E9E9
| 146112 ||  || — || August 31, 2000 || Socorro || LINEAR || EUN || align=right | 2.9 km || 
|-id=113 bgcolor=#d6d6d6
| 146113 ||  || — || August 31, 2000 || Socorro || LINEAR || THM || align=right | 6.2 km || 
|-id=114 bgcolor=#d6d6d6
| 146114 ||  || — || August 31, 2000 || Socorro || LINEAR || — || align=right | 6.0 km || 
|-id=115 bgcolor=#d6d6d6
| 146115 ||  || — || August 31, 2000 || Socorro || LINEAR || — || align=right | 4.6 km || 
|-id=116 bgcolor=#E9E9E9
| 146116 ||  || — || August 31, 2000 || Socorro || LINEAR || — || align=right | 3.7 km || 
|-id=117 bgcolor=#E9E9E9
| 146117 ||  || — || August 21, 2000 || Anderson Mesa || LONEOS || — || align=right | 3.4 km || 
|-id=118 bgcolor=#d6d6d6
| 146118 ||  || — || September 1, 2000 || Socorro || LINEAR || — || align=right | 4.4 km || 
|-id=119 bgcolor=#d6d6d6
| 146119 ||  || — || September 1, 2000 || Socorro || LINEAR || — || align=right | 5.6 km || 
|-id=120 bgcolor=#E9E9E9
| 146120 ||  || — || September 1, 2000 || Socorro || LINEAR || — || align=right | 4.7 km || 
|-id=121 bgcolor=#d6d6d6
| 146121 ||  || — || September 1, 2000 || Socorro || LINEAR || EMA || align=right | 7.5 km || 
|-id=122 bgcolor=#d6d6d6
| 146122 ||  || — || September 1, 2000 || Socorro || LINEAR || — || align=right | 4.2 km || 
|-id=123 bgcolor=#d6d6d6
| 146123 ||  || — || September 1, 2000 || Socorro || LINEAR || LIX || align=right | 6.9 km || 
|-id=124 bgcolor=#d6d6d6
| 146124 ||  || — || September 1, 2000 || Socorro || LINEAR || — || align=right | 9.4 km || 
|-id=125 bgcolor=#d6d6d6
| 146125 ||  || — || September 1, 2000 || Socorro || LINEAR || — || align=right | 3.6 km || 
|-id=126 bgcolor=#d6d6d6
| 146126 ||  || — || September 1, 2000 || Socorro || LINEAR || — || align=right | 5.5 km || 
|-id=127 bgcolor=#d6d6d6
| 146127 ||  || — || September 1, 2000 || Socorro || LINEAR || — || align=right | 5.6 km || 
|-id=128 bgcolor=#d6d6d6
| 146128 ||  || — || September 1, 2000 || Socorro || LINEAR || — || align=right | 4.5 km || 
|-id=129 bgcolor=#d6d6d6
| 146129 ||  || — || September 3, 2000 || Socorro || LINEAR || — || align=right | 5.2 km || 
|-id=130 bgcolor=#d6d6d6
| 146130 ||  || — || September 4, 2000 || Socorro || LINEAR || — || align=right | 2.5 km || 
|-id=131 bgcolor=#d6d6d6
| 146131 ||  || — || September 5, 2000 || Anderson Mesa || LONEOS || — || align=right | 3.6 km || 
|-id=132 bgcolor=#d6d6d6
| 146132 ||  || — || September 5, 2000 || Anderson Mesa || LONEOS || EUP || align=right | 8.5 km || 
|-id=133 bgcolor=#d6d6d6
| 146133 ||  || — || September 7, 2000 || Socorro || LINEAR || — || align=right | 4.8 km || 
|-id=134 bgcolor=#FA8072
| 146134 ||  || — || September 18, 2000 || Socorro || LINEAR || — || align=right | 1.3 km || 
|-id=135 bgcolor=#fefefe
| 146135 ||  || — || September 18, 2000 || Socorro || LINEAR || H || align=right | 1.4 km || 
|-id=136 bgcolor=#d6d6d6
| 146136 ||  || — || September 23, 2000 || Socorro || LINEAR || EOS || align=right | 2.8 km || 
|-id=137 bgcolor=#d6d6d6
| 146137 ||  || — || September 23, 2000 || Socorro || LINEAR || — || align=right | 6.2 km || 
|-id=138 bgcolor=#d6d6d6
| 146138 ||  || — || September 24, 2000 || Socorro || LINEAR || EOS || align=right | 3.3 km || 
|-id=139 bgcolor=#d6d6d6
| 146139 ||  || — || September 24, 2000 || Socorro || LINEAR || — || align=right | 4.2 km || 
|-id=140 bgcolor=#E9E9E9
| 146140 ||  || — || September 23, 2000 || Socorro || LINEAR || — || align=right | 4.8 km || 
|-id=141 bgcolor=#d6d6d6
| 146141 ||  || — || September 23, 2000 || Socorro || LINEAR || — || align=right | 2.8 km || 
|-id=142 bgcolor=#d6d6d6
| 146142 ||  || — || September 23, 2000 || Socorro || LINEAR || — || align=right | 4.2 km || 
|-id=143 bgcolor=#d6d6d6
| 146143 ||  || — || September 24, 2000 || Socorro || LINEAR || THM || align=right | 3.4 km || 
|-id=144 bgcolor=#d6d6d6
| 146144 ||  || — || September 24, 2000 || Socorro || LINEAR || HYG || align=right | 4.3 km || 
|-id=145 bgcolor=#d6d6d6
| 146145 ||  || — || September 24, 2000 || Socorro || LINEAR || EOS || align=right | 3.5 km || 
|-id=146 bgcolor=#d6d6d6
| 146146 ||  || — || September 23, 2000 || Socorro || LINEAR || — || align=right | 5.9 km || 
|-id=147 bgcolor=#d6d6d6
| 146147 ||  || — || September 23, 2000 || Socorro || LINEAR || EOS || align=right | 3.5 km || 
|-id=148 bgcolor=#d6d6d6
| 146148 ||  || — || September 22, 2000 || Socorro || LINEAR || — || align=right | 9.9 km || 
|-id=149 bgcolor=#d6d6d6
| 146149 ||  || — || September 23, 2000 || Socorro || LINEAR || EOS || align=right | 3.8 km || 
|-id=150 bgcolor=#d6d6d6
| 146150 ||  || — || September 23, 2000 || Socorro || LINEAR || EOS || align=right | 3.0 km || 
|-id=151 bgcolor=#d6d6d6
| 146151 ||  || — || September 23, 2000 || Socorro || LINEAR || EOS || align=right | 3.5 km || 
|-id=152 bgcolor=#d6d6d6
| 146152 ||  || — || September 24, 2000 || Socorro || LINEAR || — || align=right | 6.2 km || 
|-id=153 bgcolor=#d6d6d6
| 146153 ||  || — || September 24, 2000 || Socorro || LINEAR || TIR || align=right | 5.2 km || 
|-id=154 bgcolor=#d6d6d6
| 146154 ||  || — || September 24, 2000 || Socorro || LINEAR || EOS || align=right | 3.8 km || 
|-id=155 bgcolor=#d6d6d6
| 146155 ||  || — || September 24, 2000 || Socorro || LINEAR || TIR || align=right | 4.5 km || 
|-id=156 bgcolor=#d6d6d6
| 146156 ||  || — || September 27, 2000 || Socorro || LINEAR || MEL || align=right | 7.5 km || 
|-id=157 bgcolor=#E9E9E9
| 146157 ||  || — || September 23, 2000 || Socorro || LINEAR || — || align=right | 4.3 km || 
|-id=158 bgcolor=#d6d6d6
| 146158 ||  || — || September 23, 2000 || Socorro || LINEAR || — || align=right | 7.4 km || 
|-id=159 bgcolor=#d6d6d6
| 146159 ||  || — || September 28, 2000 || Socorro || LINEAR || — || align=right | 6.9 km || 
|-id=160 bgcolor=#d6d6d6
| 146160 ||  || — || September 20, 2000 || Kitt Peak || Spacewatch || — || align=right | 5.0 km || 
|-id=161 bgcolor=#d6d6d6
| 146161 ||  || — || September 21, 2000 || Haleakala || NEAT || — || align=right | 5.4 km || 
|-id=162 bgcolor=#d6d6d6
| 146162 ||  || — || September 21, 2000 || Haleakala || NEAT || — || align=right | 7.3 km || 
|-id=163 bgcolor=#d6d6d6
| 146163 ||  || — || September 24, 2000 || Socorro || LINEAR || THM || align=right | 5.7 km || 
|-id=164 bgcolor=#d6d6d6
| 146164 ||  || — || September 27, 2000 || Socorro || LINEAR || — || align=right | 3.3 km || 
|-id=165 bgcolor=#d6d6d6
| 146165 ||  || — || September 27, 2000 || Socorro || LINEAR || — || align=right | 5.0 km || 
|-id=166 bgcolor=#d6d6d6
| 146166 ||  || — || September 26, 2000 || Socorro || LINEAR || — || align=right | 6.2 km || 
|-id=167 bgcolor=#d6d6d6
| 146167 ||  || — || September 27, 2000 || Socorro || LINEAR || — || align=right | 8.3 km || 
|-id=168 bgcolor=#d6d6d6
| 146168 ||  || — || September 27, 2000 || Socorro || LINEAR || THM || align=right | 4.9 km || 
|-id=169 bgcolor=#d6d6d6
| 146169 ||  || — || September 28, 2000 || Socorro || LINEAR || — || align=right | 7.8 km || 
|-id=170 bgcolor=#d6d6d6
| 146170 ||  || — || September 28, 2000 || Socorro || LINEAR || — || align=right | 5.9 km || 
|-id=171 bgcolor=#d6d6d6
| 146171 ||  || — || September 23, 2000 || Socorro || LINEAR || — || align=right | 3.5 km || 
|-id=172 bgcolor=#d6d6d6
| 146172 ||  || — || September 23, 2000 || Socorro || LINEAR || — || align=right | 5.0 km || 
|-id=173 bgcolor=#d6d6d6
| 146173 ||  || — || September 23, 2000 || Socorro || LINEAR || — || align=right | 5.3 km || 
|-id=174 bgcolor=#d6d6d6
| 146174 ||  || — || September 27, 2000 || Socorro || LINEAR || — || align=right | 4.3 km || 
|-id=175 bgcolor=#d6d6d6
| 146175 ||  || — || September 28, 2000 || Socorro || LINEAR || EOS || align=right | 4.2 km || 
|-id=176 bgcolor=#d6d6d6
| 146176 ||  || — || September 28, 2000 || Socorro || LINEAR || — || align=right | 5.3 km || 
|-id=177 bgcolor=#d6d6d6
| 146177 ||  || — || September 30, 2000 || Socorro || LINEAR || — || align=right | 6.0 km || 
|-id=178 bgcolor=#d6d6d6
| 146178 ||  || — || September 30, 2000 || Socorro || LINEAR || EOS || align=right | 3.5 km || 
|-id=179 bgcolor=#d6d6d6
| 146179 ||  || — || September 25, 2000 || Socorro || LINEAR || — || align=right | 7.5 km || 
|-id=180 bgcolor=#d6d6d6
| 146180 ||  || — || September 27, 2000 || Socorro || LINEAR || — || align=right | 7.3 km || 
|-id=181 bgcolor=#d6d6d6
| 146181 ||  || — || September 30, 2000 || Socorro || LINEAR || — || align=right | 6.8 km || 
|-id=182 bgcolor=#d6d6d6
| 146182 ||  || — || September 28, 2000 || Kitt Peak || Spacewatch || KOR || align=right | 2.4 km || 
|-id=183 bgcolor=#d6d6d6
| 146183 ||  || — || September 29, 2000 || Haleakala || NEAT || THB || align=right | 4.7 km || 
|-id=184 bgcolor=#d6d6d6
| 146184 ||  || — || September 26, 2000 || Haleakala || NEAT || LIX || align=right | 5.6 km || 
|-id=185 bgcolor=#d6d6d6
| 146185 ||  || — || September 25, 2000 || Haleakala || NEAT || ALA || align=right | 6.3 km || 
|-id=186 bgcolor=#d6d6d6
| 146186 ||  || — || September 25, 2000 || Socorro || LINEAR || EUP || align=right | 7.8 km || 
|-id=187 bgcolor=#E9E9E9
| 146187 ||  || — || September 21, 2000 || Anderson Mesa || LONEOS || AGN || align=right | 2.2 km || 
|-id=188 bgcolor=#fefefe
| 146188 ||  || — || October 1, 2000 || Socorro || LINEAR || H || align=right | 1.0 km || 
|-id=189 bgcolor=#d6d6d6
| 146189 ||  || — || October 1, 2000 || Socorro || LINEAR || — || align=right | 5.1 km || 
|-id=190 bgcolor=#d6d6d6
| 146190 ||  || — || October 2, 2000 || Socorro || LINEAR || — || align=right | 4.6 km || 
|-id=191 bgcolor=#fefefe
| 146191 ||  || — || October 4, 2000 || Socorro || LINEAR || H || align=right | 1.4 km || 
|-id=192 bgcolor=#d6d6d6
| 146192 ||  || — || October 1, 2000 || Socorro || LINEAR || — || align=right | 6.2 km || 
|-id=193 bgcolor=#d6d6d6
| 146193 ||  || — || October 1, 2000 || Socorro || LINEAR || — || align=right | 4.0 km || 
|-id=194 bgcolor=#d6d6d6
| 146194 ||  || — || October 1, 2000 || Socorro || LINEAR || — || align=right | 7.1 km || 
|-id=195 bgcolor=#d6d6d6
| 146195 ||  || — || October 1, 2000 || Socorro || LINEAR || KOR || align=right | 2.2 km || 
|-id=196 bgcolor=#d6d6d6
| 146196 ||  || — || October 1, 2000 || Socorro || LINEAR || THM || align=right | 3.4 km || 
|-id=197 bgcolor=#d6d6d6
| 146197 ||  || — || October 2, 2000 || Anderson Mesa || LONEOS || EOS || align=right | 3.4 km || 
|-id=198 bgcolor=#E9E9E9
| 146198 ||  || — || October 3, 2000 || McGraw-Hill || B. Chaboyer || — || align=right | 3.4 km || 
|-id=199 bgcolor=#d6d6d6
| 146199 ||  || — || October 24, 2000 || Socorro || LINEAR || — || align=right | 7.6 km || 
|-id=200 bgcolor=#d6d6d6
| 146200 ||  || — || October 25, 2000 || Socorro || LINEAR || — || align=right | 5.1 km || 
|}

146201–146300 

|-bgcolor=#d6d6d6
| 146201 ||  || — || October 25, 2000 || Socorro || LINEAR || — || align=right | 6.9 km || 
|-id=202 bgcolor=#d6d6d6
| 146202 ||  || — || October 24, 2000 || Socorro || LINEAR || HYG || align=right | 5.5 km || 
|-id=203 bgcolor=#d6d6d6
| 146203 ||  || — || October 25, 2000 || Socorro || LINEAR || EOS || align=right | 4.3 km || 
|-id=204 bgcolor=#d6d6d6
| 146204 ||  || — || October 25, 2000 || Socorro || LINEAR || — || align=right | 5.1 km || 
|-id=205 bgcolor=#d6d6d6
| 146205 ||  || — || October 25, 2000 || Socorro || LINEAR || — || align=right | 4.5 km || 
|-id=206 bgcolor=#d6d6d6
| 146206 ||  || — || October 25, 2000 || Socorro || LINEAR || — || align=right | 4.3 km || 
|-id=207 bgcolor=#d6d6d6
| 146207 ||  || — || October 25, 2000 || Socorro || LINEAR || — || align=right | 5.5 km || 
|-id=208 bgcolor=#d6d6d6
| 146208 ||  || — || October 25, 2000 || Socorro || LINEAR || — || align=right | 5.4 km || 
|-id=209 bgcolor=#d6d6d6
| 146209 ||  || — || October 30, 2000 || Socorro || LINEAR || THM || align=right | 4.9 km || 
|-id=210 bgcolor=#d6d6d6
| 146210 ||  || — || October 25, 2000 || Socorro || LINEAR || — || align=right | 3.0 km || 
|-id=211 bgcolor=#d6d6d6
| 146211 ||  || — || October 25, 2000 || Socorro || LINEAR || — || align=right | 5.9 km || 
|-id=212 bgcolor=#d6d6d6
| 146212 ||  || — || October 29, 2000 || Socorro || LINEAR || — || align=right | 5.5 km || 
|-id=213 bgcolor=#d6d6d6
| 146213 ||  || — || October 30, 2000 || Socorro || LINEAR || — || align=right | 5.4 km || 
|-id=214 bgcolor=#d6d6d6
| 146214 ||  || — || November 1, 2000 || Socorro || LINEAR || — || align=right | 4.3 km || 
|-id=215 bgcolor=#d6d6d6
| 146215 ||  || — || November 1, 2000 || Socorro || LINEAR || — || align=right | 7.7 km || 
|-id=216 bgcolor=#d6d6d6
| 146216 ||  || — || November 2, 2000 || Socorro || LINEAR || HYG || align=right | 6.4 km || 
|-id=217 bgcolor=#d6d6d6
| 146217 ||  || — || November 3, 2000 || Socorro || LINEAR || EOS || align=right | 3.6 km || 
|-id=218 bgcolor=#d6d6d6
| 146218 ||  || — || November 3, 2000 || Socorro || LINEAR || — || align=right | 7.7 km || 
|-id=219 bgcolor=#d6d6d6
| 146219 ||  || — || November 3, 2000 || Socorro || LINEAR || HYG || align=right | 4.0 km || 
|-id=220 bgcolor=#d6d6d6
| 146220 ||  || — || November 3, 2000 || Socorro || LINEAR || EOS || align=right | 3.0 km || 
|-id=221 bgcolor=#d6d6d6
| 146221 ||  || — || November 3, 2000 || Socorro || LINEAR || — || align=right | 4.4 km || 
|-id=222 bgcolor=#d6d6d6
| 146222 ||  || — || November 19, 2000 || Socorro || LINEAR || — || align=right | 6.9 km || 
|-id=223 bgcolor=#d6d6d6
| 146223 ||  || — || November 19, 2000 || Socorro || LINEAR || EOS || align=right | 3.3 km || 
|-id=224 bgcolor=#d6d6d6
| 146224 ||  || — || November 20, 2000 || Socorro || LINEAR || EOS || align=right | 3.4 km || 
|-id=225 bgcolor=#d6d6d6
| 146225 ||  || — || November 21, 2000 || Socorro || LINEAR || — || align=right | 7.7 km || 
|-id=226 bgcolor=#d6d6d6
| 146226 ||  || — || November 19, 2000 || Socorro || LINEAR || — || align=right | 6.9 km || 
|-id=227 bgcolor=#d6d6d6
| 146227 ||  || — || November 19, 2000 || Socorro || LINEAR || — || align=right | 6.1 km || 
|-id=228 bgcolor=#d6d6d6
| 146228 ||  || — || November 20, 2000 || Socorro || LINEAR || — || align=right | 6.7 km || 
|-id=229 bgcolor=#d6d6d6
| 146229 ||  || — || November 20, 2000 || Socorro || LINEAR || HYG || align=right | 5.5 km || 
|-id=230 bgcolor=#d6d6d6
| 146230 ||  || — || November 21, 2000 || Socorro || LINEAR || — || align=right | 6.7 km || 
|-id=231 bgcolor=#d6d6d6
| 146231 ||  || — || November 26, 2000 || Socorro || LINEAR || — || align=right | 6.7 km || 
|-id=232 bgcolor=#d6d6d6
| 146232 ||  || — || November 29, 2000 || Socorro || LINEAR || — || align=right | 5.4 km || 
|-id=233 bgcolor=#d6d6d6
| 146233 ||  || — || November 20, 2000 || Socorro || LINEAR || EOS || align=right | 4.3 km || 
|-id=234 bgcolor=#d6d6d6
| 146234 ||  || — || November 20, 2000 || Anderson Mesa || LONEOS || — || align=right | 5.5 km || 
|-id=235 bgcolor=#d6d6d6
| 146235 ||  || — || November 21, 2000 || Haleakala || NEAT || — || align=right | 4.8 km || 
|-id=236 bgcolor=#d6d6d6
| 146236 ||  || — || November 28, 2000 || Haleakala || NEAT || TIR || align=right | 4.7 km || 
|-id=237 bgcolor=#d6d6d6
| 146237 ||  || — || November 30, 2000 || Socorro || LINEAR || — || align=right | 7.0 km || 
|-id=238 bgcolor=#d6d6d6
| 146238 ||  || — || November 30, 2000 || Socorro || LINEAR || — || align=right | 3.8 km || 
|-id=239 bgcolor=#d6d6d6
| 146239 ||  || — || November 25, 2000 || Socorro || LINEAR || — || align=right | 5.2 km || 
|-id=240 bgcolor=#d6d6d6
| 146240 ||  || — || November 29, 2000 || Anderson Mesa || LONEOS || — || align=right | 5.8 km || 
|-id=241 bgcolor=#d6d6d6
| 146241 ||  || — || November 19, 2000 || Anderson Mesa || LONEOS || EMA || align=right | 6.7 km || 
|-id=242 bgcolor=#d6d6d6
| 146242 ||  || — || December 1, 2000 || Socorro || LINEAR || URS || align=right | 9.6 km || 
|-id=243 bgcolor=#d6d6d6
| 146243 ||  || — || December 1, 2000 || Socorro || LINEAR || LIX || align=right | 7.0 km || 
|-id=244 bgcolor=#d6d6d6
| 146244 ||  || — || December 1, 2000 || Socorro || LINEAR || — || align=right | 6.9 km || 
|-id=245 bgcolor=#d6d6d6
| 146245 ||  || — || December 4, 2000 || Socorro || LINEAR || — || align=right | 8.3 km || 
|-id=246 bgcolor=#d6d6d6
| 146246 ||  || — || December 4, 2000 || Socorro || LINEAR || LIX || align=right | 6.8 km || 
|-id=247 bgcolor=#d6d6d6
| 146247 ||  || — || December 4, 2000 || Socorro || LINEAR || — || align=right | 6.4 km || 
|-id=248 bgcolor=#d6d6d6
| 146248 ||  || — || December 5, 2000 || Socorro || LINEAR || — || align=right | 8.7 km || 
|-id=249 bgcolor=#d6d6d6
| 146249 ||  || — || December 20, 2000 || Socorro || LINEAR || — || align=right | 6.2 km || 
|-id=250 bgcolor=#d6d6d6
| 146250 ||  || — || December 23, 2000 || Haleakala || NEAT || EUP || align=right | 9.2 km || 
|-id=251 bgcolor=#d6d6d6
| 146251 ||  || — || December 30, 2000 || Socorro || LINEAR || — || align=right | 6.7 km || 
|-id=252 bgcolor=#d6d6d6
| 146252 ||  || — || December 30, 2000 || Socorro || LINEAR || — || align=right | 4.8 km || 
|-id=253 bgcolor=#d6d6d6
| 146253 ||  || — || December 30, 2000 || Socorro || LINEAR || MEL || align=right | 8.1 km || 
|-id=254 bgcolor=#fefefe
| 146254 ||  || — || December 30, 2000 || Socorro || LINEAR || — || align=right | 1.2 km || 
|-id=255 bgcolor=#d6d6d6
| 146255 ||  || — || December 30, 2000 || Socorro || LINEAR || — || align=right | 7.7 km || 
|-id=256 bgcolor=#d6d6d6
| 146256 ||  || — || December 30, 2000 || Socorro || LINEAR || THM || align=right | 4.2 km || 
|-id=257 bgcolor=#d6d6d6
| 146257 ||  || — || December 17, 2000 || Socorro || LINEAR || THB || align=right | 6.6 km || 
|-id=258 bgcolor=#d6d6d6
| 146258 ||  || — || January 3, 2001 || Socorro || LINEAR || 2:1J || align=right | 4.7 km || 
|-id=259 bgcolor=#fefefe
| 146259 ||  || — || January 19, 2001 || Socorro || LINEAR || — || align=right | 1.3 km || 
|-id=260 bgcolor=#d6d6d6
| 146260 ||  || — || January 19, 2001 || Socorro || LINEAR || HYG || align=right | 5.4 km || 
|-id=261 bgcolor=#d6d6d6
| 146261 ||  || — || January 19, 2001 || Kitt Peak || Spacewatch || EUP || align=right | 8.0 km || 
|-id=262 bgcolor=#fefefe
| 146262 ||  || — || January 23, 2001 || Kitt Peak || Spacewatch || — || align=right | 1.5 km || 
|-id=263 bgcolor=#d6d6d6
| 146263 ||  || — || January 26, 2001 || Socorro || LINEAR || — || align=right | 7.5 km || 
|-id=264 bgcolor=#d6d6d6
| 146264 ||  || — || January 31, 2001 || Socorro || LINEAR || HYG || align=right | 5.7 km || 
|-id=265 bgcolor=#d6d6d6
| 146265 ||  || — || January 24, 2001 || Socorro || LINEAR || — || align=right | 7.0 km || 
|-id=266 bgcolor=#d6d6d6
| 146266 || 2001 CY || — || February 1, 2001 || Socorro || LINEAR || — || align=right | 7.4 km || 
|-id=267 bgcolor=#fefefe
| 146267 ||  || — || February 1, 2001 || Socorro || LINEAR || — || align=right | 2.3 km || 
|-id=268 bgcolor=#fefefe
| 146268 Jennipolakis || 2001 DQ ||  || February 16, 2001 || Junk Bond || D. Healy || — || align=right | 1.1 km || 
|-id=269 bgcolor=#d6d6d6
| 146269 ||  || — || February 19, 2001 || Socorro || LINEAR || ALA || align=right | 7.4 km || 
|-id=270 bgcolor=#fefefe
| 146270 ||  || — || February 16, 2001 || Socorro || LINEAR || V || align=right | 1.2 km || 
|-id=271 bgcolor=#d6d6d6
| 146271 ||  || — || February 20, 2001 || Socorro || LINEAR || HYG || align=right | 5.8 km || 
|-id=272 bgcolor=#fefefe
| 146272 ||  || — || March 2, 2001 || Anderson Mesa || LONEOS || — || align=right | 2.1 km || 
|-id=273 bgcolor=#fefefe
| 146273 ||  || — || March 15, 2001 || Kitt Peak || Spacewatch || FLO || align=right | 1.4 km || 
|-id=274 bgcolor=#fefefe
| 146274 ||  || — || March 19, 2001 || Socorro || LINEAR || — || align=right | 1.3 km || 
|-id=275 bgcolor=#fefefe
| 146275 ||  || — || March 19, 2001 || Anderson Mesa || LONEOS || NYS || align=right | 1.8 km || 
|-id=276 bgcolor=#fefefe
| 146276 ||  || — || March 18, 2001 || Socorro || LINEAR || MAS || align=right | 1.4 km || 
|-id=277 bgcolor=#fefefe
| 146277 ||  || — || March 18, 2001 || Socorro || LINEAR || — || align=right | 2.5 km || 
|-id=278 bgcolor=#fefefe
| 146278 ||  || — || March 19, 2001 || Socorro || LINEAR || FLO || align=right | 1.2 km || 
|-id=279 bgcolor=#fefefe
| 146279 ||  || — || March 19, 2001 || Socorro || LINEAR || NYS || align=right | 1.2 km || 
|-id=280 bgcolor=#fefefe
| 146280 ||  || — || March 19, 2001 || Socorro || LINEAR || — || align=right | 1.1 km || 
|-id=281 bgcolor=#fefefe
| 146281 ||  || — || March 19, 2001 || Socorro || LINEAR || — || align=right | 1.5 km || 
|-id=282 bgcolor=#fefefe
| 146282 ||  || — || March 16, 2001 || Socorro || LINEAR || V || align=right | 1.3 km || 
|-id=283 bgcolor=#fefefe
| 146283 ||  || — || March 18, 2001 || Socorro || LINEAR || — || align=right | 1.8 km || 
|-id=284 bgcolor=#fefefe
| 146284 ||  || — || March 29, 2001 || Kitt Peak || Spacewatch || — || align=right | 1.2 km || 
|-id=285 bgcolor=#fefefe
| 146285 ||  || — || March 24, 2001 || Anderson Mesa || LONEOS || — || align=right | 2.0 km || 
|-id=286 bgcolor=#fefefe
| 146286 ||  || — || March 26, 2001 || Haleakala || NEAT || NYS || align=right | 1.2 km || 
|-id=287 bgcolor=#fefefe
| 146287 ||  || — || March 20, 2001 || Anderson Mesa || LONEOS || — || align=right | 1.4 km || 
|-id=288 bgcolor=#fefefe
| 146288 || 2001 GC || — || April 1, 2001 || Kanab || E. E. Sheridan || — || align=right | 1.9 km || 
|-id=289 bgcolor=#fefefe
| 146289 ||  || — || April 13, 2001 || Socorro || LINEAR || — || align=right | 2.6 km || 
|-id=290 bgcolor=#fefefe
| 146290 ||  || — || April 16, 2001 || Socorro || LINEAR || FLO || align=right | 1.2 km || 
|-id=291 bgcolor=#fefefe
| 146291 ||  || — || April 18, 2001 || Socorro || LINEAR || — || align=right | 1.5 km || 
|-id=292 bgcolor=#fefefe
| 146292 ||  || — || April 21, 2001 || Bergisch Gladbach || W. Bickel || — || align=right | 1.8 km || 
|-id=293 bgcolor=#fefefe
| 146293 ||  || — || April 23, 2001 || Socorro || LINEAR || V || align=right | 1.2 km || 
|-id=294 bgcolor=#fefefe
| 146294 ||  || — || April 26, 2001 || Kitt Peak || Spacewatch || V || align=right data-sort-value="0.96" | 960 m || 
|-id=295 bgcolor=#fefefe
| 146295 ||  || — || April 16, 2001 || Anderson Mesa || LONEOS || — || align=right | 1.1 km || 
|-id=296 bgcolor=#fefefe
| 146296 ||  || — || April 23, 2001 || Socorro || LINEAR || NYS || align=right | 1.2 km || 
|-id=297 bgcolor=#fefefe
| 146297 ||  || — || April 23, 2001 || Socorro || LINEAR || V || align=right | 1.2 km || 
|-id=298 bgcolor=#fefefe
| 146298 ||  || — || April 30, 2001 || Socorro || LINEAR || NYS || align=right | 1.2 km || 
|-id=299 bgcolor=#fefefe
| 146299 || 2001 JR || — || May 4, 2001 || Haleakala || NEAT || — || align=right | 1.8 km || 
|-id=300 bgcolor=#fefefe
| 146300 ||  || — || May 14, 2001 || Haleakala || NEAT || — || align=right | 1.7 km || 
|}

146301–146400 

|-bgcolor=#fefefe
| 146301 || 2001 KN || — || May 17, 2001 || Socorro || LINEAR || NYS || align=right | 1.3 km || 
|-id=302 bgcolor=#fefefe
| 146302 ||  || — || May 17, 2001 || Socorro || LINEAR || MAS || align=right | 1.5 km || 
|-id=303 bgcolor=#fefefe
| 146303 ||  || — || May 17, 2001 || Socorro || LINEAR || FLO || align=right | 1.0 km || 
|-id=304 bgcolor=#fefefe
| 146304 ||  || — || May 18, 2001 || Socorro || LINEAR || — || align=right | 1.2 km || 
|-id=305 bgcolor=#fefefe
| 146305 ||  || — || May 18, 2001 || Socorro || LINEAR || V || align=right | 1.5 km || 
|-id=306 bgcolor=#fefefe
| 146306 ||  || — || May 21, 2001 || Socorro || LINEAR || NYS || align=right | 1.3 km || 
|-id=307 bgcolor=#fefefe
| 146307 ||  || — || May 23, 2001 || Socorro || LINEAR || PHO || align=right | 1.6 km || 
|-id=308 bgcolor=#E9E9E9
| 146308 ||  || — || May 18, 2001 || Socorro || LINEAR || — || align=right | 2.1 km || 
|-id=309 bgcolor=#fefefe
| 146309 ||  || — || May 21, 2001 || Socorro || LINEAR || — || align=right | 1.9 km || 
|-id=310 bgcolor=#fefefe
| 146310 ||  || — || May 21, 2001 || Socorro || LINEAR || — || align=right | 2.1 km || 
|-id=311 bgcolor=#fefefe
| 146311 ||  || — || May 22, 2001 || Socorro || LINEAR || V || align=right | 1.1 km || 
|-id=312 bgcolor=#fefefe
| 146312 ||  || — || May 16, 2001 || Kitt Peak || Spacewatch || — || align=right | 2.0 km || 
|-id=313 bgcolor=#fefefe
| 146313 ||  || — || May 18, 2001 || Anderson Mesa || LONEOS || — || align=right | 1.3 km || 
|-id=314 bgcolor=#fefefe
| 146314 ||  || — || May 17, 2001 || Haleakala || NEAT || — || align=right | 1.3 km || 
|-id=315 bgcolor=#E9E9E9
| 146315 ||  || — || May 23, 2001 || Socorro || LINEAR || — || align=right | 3.1 km || 
|-id=316 bgcolor=#fefefe
| 146316 ||  || — || May 16, 2001 || Haleakala || NEAT || V || align=right | 1.1 km || 
|-id=317 bgcolor=#fefefe
| 146317 ||  || — || May 18, 2001 || Socorro || LINEAR || NYS || align=right | 1.3 km || 
|-id=318 bgcolor=#fefefe
| 146318 ||  || — || June 13, 2001 || Socorro || LINEAR || — || align=right | 2.0 km || 
|-id=319 bgcolor=#fefefe
| 146319 ||  || — || June 13, 2001 || Socorro || LINEAR || NYS || align=right | 1.5 km || 
|-id=320 bgcolor=#fefefe
| 146320 ||  || — || June 15, 2001 || Socorro || LINEAR || V || align=right | 1.0 km || 
|-id=321 bgcolor=#fefefe
| 146321 ||  || — || June 11, 2001 || Kitt Peak || Spacewatch || — || align=right | 2.4 km || 
|-id=322 bgcolor=#E9E9E9
| 146322 ||  || — || June 15, 2001 || Socorro || LINEAR || — || align=right | 2.5 km || 
|-id=323 bgcolor=#E9E9E9
| 146323 ||  || — || June 15, 2001 || Socorro || LINEAR || EUN || align=right | 3.5 km || 
|-id=324 bgcolor=#E9E9E9
| 146324 ||  || — || June 15, 2001 || Socorro || LINEAR || — || align=right | 6.5 km || 
|-id=325 bgcolor=#fefefe
| 146325 ||  || — || June 23, 2001 || Palomar || NEAT || — || align=right | 1.5 km || 
|-id=326 bgcolor=#E9E9E9
| 146326 ||  || — || July 13, 2001 || Palomar || NEAT || — || align=right | 4.5 km || 
|-id=327 bgcolor=#fefefe
| 146327 ||  || — || July 13, 2001 || Palomar || NEAT || — || align=right | 1.4 km || 
|-id=328 bgcolor=#fefefe
| 146328 ||  || — || July 14, 2001 || Palomar || NEAT || — || align=right | 1.4 km || 
|-id=329 bgcolor=#fefefe
| 146329 ||  || — || July 14, 2001 || Palomar || NEAT || — || align=right | 1.6 km || 
|-id=330 bgcolor=#fefefe
| 146330 ||  || — || July 14, 2001 || Palomar || NEAT || — || align=right | 1.5 km || 
|-id=331 bgcolor=#E9E9E9
| 146331 ||  || — || July 13, 2001 || Palomar || NEAT || — || align=right | 2.0 km || 
|-id=332 bgcolor=#E9E9E9
| 146332 || 2001 OL || — || July 17, 2001 || Palomar || NEAT || — || align=right | 2.5 km || 
|-id=333 bgcolor=#E9E9E9
| 146333 ||  || — || July 17, 2001 || Haleakala || NEAT || — || align=right | 1.9 km || 
|-id=334 bgcolor=#fefefe
| 146334 ||  || — || July 19, 2001 || Palomar || NEAT || V || align=right | 1.1 km || 
|-id=335 bgcolor=#E9E9E9
| 146335 ||  || — || July 17, 2001 || Palomar || NEAT || MRX || align=right | 1.7 km || 
|-id=336 bgcolor=#E9E9E9
| 146336 ||  || — || July 20, 2001 || Socorro || LINEAR || — || align=right | 1.8 km || 
|-id=337 bgcolor=#E9E9E9
| 146337 ||  || — || July 20, 2001 || Socorro || LINEAR || JUN || align=right | 2.7 km || 
|-id=338 bgcolor=#E9E9E9
| 146338 ||  || — || July 20, 2001 || Palomar || NEAT || — || align=right | 2.2 km || 
|-id=339 bgcolor=#E9E9E9
| 146339 ||  || — || July 16, 2001 || Anderson Mesa || LONEOS || — || align=right | 1.6 km || 
|-id=340 bgcolor=#E9E9E9
| 146340 ||  || — || July 21, 2001 || Palomar || NEAT || — || align=right | 6.4 km || 
|-id=341 bgcolor=#E9E9E9
| 146341 ||  || — || July 21, 2001 || Palomar || NEAT || — || align=right | 3.2 km || 
|-id=342 bgcolor=#E9E9E9
| 146342 ||  || — || July 21, 2001 || Haleakala || NEAT || — || align=right | 1.6 km || 
|-id=343 bgcolor=#fefefe
| 146343 ||  || — || July 21, 2001 || Haleakala || NEAT || — || align=right | 2.0 km || 
|-id=344 bgcolor=#E9E9E9
| 146344 ||  || — || July 16, 2001 || Anderson Mesa || LONEOS || ADE || align=right | 5.1 km || 
|-id=345 bgcolor=#fefefe
| 146345 ||  || — || July 21, 2001 || Anderson Mesa || LONEOS || — || align=right | 2.4 km || 
|-id=346 bgcolor=#E9E9E9
| 146346 ||  || — || July 20, 2001 || Socorro || LINEAR || ADE || align=right | 3.8 km || 
|-id=347 bgcolor=#E9E9E9
| 146347 ||  || — || July 29, 2001 || Palomar || NEAT || — || align=right | 2.3 km || 
|-id=348 bgcolor=#E9E9E9
| 146348 ||  || — || July 25, 2001 || Palomar || NEAT || — || align=right | 3.0 km || 
|-id=349 bgcolor=#E9E9E9
| 146349 ||  || — || July 25, 2001 || Haleakala || NEAT || — || align=right | 2.9 km || 
|-id=350 bgcolor=#E9E9E9
| 146350 ||  || — || July 25, 2001 || Haleakala || NEAT || — || align=right | 2.1 km || 
|-id=351 bgcolor=#E9E9E9
| 146351 ||  || — || July 25, 2001 || Haleakala || NEAT || — || align=right | 1.8 km || 
|-id=352 bgcolor=#fefefe
| 146352 ||  || — || July 29, 2001 || Socorro || LINEAR || — || align=right | 1.6 km || 
|-id=353 bgcolor=#E9E9E9
| 146353 ||  || — || July 29, 2001 || Socorro || LINEAR || ADE || align=right | 4.0 km || 
|-id=354 bgcolor=#E9E9E9
| 146354 ||  || — || July 29, 2001 || Socorro || LINEAR || — || align=right | 2.3 km || 
|-id=355 bgcolor=#E9E9E9
| 146355 ||  || — || July 29, 2001 || Socorro || LINEAR || — || align=right | 2.7 km || 
|-id=356 bgcolor=#E9E9E9
| 146356 ||  || — || July 29, 2001 || Socorro || LINEAR || — || align=right | 4.9 km || 
|-id=357 bgcolor=#E9E9E9
| 146357 ||  || — || July 29, 2001 || Socorro || LINEAR || — || align=right | 4.5 km || 
|-id=358 bgcolor=#E9E9E9
| 146358 ||  || — || July 30, 2001 || Palomar || NEAT || — || align=right | 3.4 km || 
|-id=359 bgcolor=#E9E9E9
| 146359 ||  || — || August 6, 2001 || Palomar || NEAT || — || align=right | 3.9 km || 
|-id=360 bgcolor=#E9E9E9
| 146360 ||  || — || August 10, 2001 || Palomar || NEAT || HNS || align=right | 2.5 km || 
|-id=361 bgcolor=#E9E9E9
| 146361 ||  || — || August 10, 2001 || Palomar || NEAT || — || align=right | 3.2 km || 
|-id=362 bgcolor=#E9E9E9
| 146362 ||  || — || August 13, 2001 || Farra d'Isonzo || Farra d'Isonzo || — || align=right | 2.3 km || 
|-id=363 bgcolor=#E9E9E9
| 146363 ||  || — || August 11, 2001 || Haleakala || NEAT || — || align=right | 1.4 km || 
|-id=364 bgcolor=#E9E9E9
| 146364 ||  || — || August 11, 2001 || Haleakala || NEAT || — || align=right | 1.5 km || 
|-id=365 bgcolor=#E9E9E9
| 146365 ||  || — || August 10, 2001 || Palomar || NEAT || RAF || align=right | 1.8 km || 
|-id=366 bgcolor=#E9E9E9
| 146366 ||  || — || August 11, 2001 || Palomar || NEAT || — || align=right | 2.1 km || 
|-id=367 bgcolor=#E9E9E9
| 146367 ||  || — || August 12, 2001 || Palomar || NEAT || — || align=right | 2.9 km || 
|-id=368 bgcolor=#E9E9E9
| 146368 ||  || — || August 12, 2001 || Palomar || NEAT || — || align=right | 2.1 km || 
|-id=369 bgcolor=#fefefe
| 146369 ||  || — || August 15, 2001 || Haleakala || NEAT || — || align=right | 1.5 km || 
|-id=370 bgcolor=#E9E9E9
| 146370 ||  || — || August 14, 2001 || Haleakala || NEAT || — || align=right | 1.8 km || 
|-id=371 bgcolor=#E9E9E9
| 146371 ||  || — || August 13, 2001 || Haleakala || NEAT || — || align=right | 1.4 km || 
|-id=372 bgcolor=#E9E9E9
| 146372 ||  || — || August 16, 2001 || Ametlla de Mar || J. Nomen || RAF || align=right | 1.8 km || 
|-id=373 bgcolor=#E9E9E9
| 146373 ||  || — || August 16, 2001 || Socorro || LINEAR || — || align=right | 2.7 km || 
|-id=374 bgcolor=#fefefe
| 146374 ||  || — || August 16, 2001 || Socorro || LINEAR || MAS || align=right | 1.2 km || 
|-id=375 bgcolor=#E9E9E9
| 146375 ||  || — || August 16, 2001 || Socorro || LINEAR || — || align=right | 1.5 km || 
|-id=376 bgcolor=#E9E9E9
| 146376 ||  || — || August 16, 2001 || Socorro || LINEAR || — || align=right | 5.2 km || 
|-id=377 bgcolor=#E9E9E9
| 146377 ||  || — || August 16, 2001 || Socorro || LINEAR || — || align=right | 2.0 km || 
|-id=378 bgcolor=#E9E9E9
| 146378 ||  || — || August 17, 2001 || Palomar || NEAT || — || align=right | 5.1 km || 
|-id=379 bgcolor=#E9E9E9
| 146379 ||  || — || August 16, 2001 || Socorro || LINEAR || — || align=right | 1.8 km || 
|-id=380 bgcolor=#E9E9E9
| 146380 ||  || — || August 16, 2001 || Socorro || LINEAR || — || align=right | 3.4 km || 
|-id=381 bgcolor=#E9E9E9
| 146381 ||  || — || August 16, 2001 || Socorro || LINEAR || — || align=right | 1.8 km || 
|-id=382 bgcolor=#E9E9E9
| 146382 ||  || — || August 16, 2001 || Socorro || LINEAR || — || align=right | 1.8 km || 
|-id=383 bgcolor=#E9E9E9
| 146383 ||  || — || August 16, 2001 || Socorro || LINEAR || — || align=right | 1.6 km || 
|-id=384 bgcolor=#E9E9E9
| 146384 ||  || — || August 17, 2001 || Socorro || LINEAR || — || align=right | 5.4 km || 
|-id=385 bgcolor=#E9E9E9
| 146385 ||  || — || August 16, 2001 || Socorro || LINEAR || ADE || align=right | 5.5 km || 
|-id=386 bgcolor=#E9E9E9
| 146386 ||  || — || August 17, 2001 || Socorro || LINEAR || — || align=right | 5.0 km || 
|-id=387 bgcolor=#E9E9E9
| 146387 ||  || — || August 16, 2001 || Socorro || LINEAR || — || align=right | 3.7 km || 
|-id=388 bgcolor=#E9E9E9
| 146388 ||  || — || August 17, 2001 || Socorro || LINEAR || — || align=right | 3.7 km || 
|-id=389 bgcolor=#E9E9E9
| 146389 ||  || — || August 17, 2001 || Socorro || LINEAR || — || align=right | 2.0 km || 
|-id=390 bgcolor=#E9E9E9
| 146390 ||  || — || August 17, 2001 || Palomar || NEAT || KRM || align=right | 4.2 km || 
|-id=391 bgcolor=#E9E9E9
| 146391 ||  || — || August 18, 2001 || Socorro || LINEAR || EUN || align=right | 3.1 km || 
|-id=392 bgcolor=#E9E9E9
| 146392 ||  || — || August 17, 2001 || Socorro || LINEAR || — || align=right | 2.3 km || 
|-id=393 bgcolor=#E9E9E9
| 146393 ||  || — || August 18, 2001 || Socorro || LINEAR || — || align=right | 4.7 km || 
|-id=394 bgcolor=#E9E9E9
| 146394 ||  || — || August 21, 2001 || Socorro || LINEAR || — || align=right | 2.5 km || 
|-id=395 bgcolor=#E9E9E9
| 146395 ||  || — || August 21, 2001 || Kitt Peak || Spacewatch || — || align=right | 1.5 km || 
|-id=396 bgcolor=#E9E9E9
| 146396 ||  || — || August 22, 2001 || Haleakala || NEAT || — || align=right | 3.5 km || 
|-id=397 bgcolor=#E9E9E9
| 146397 ||  || — || August 27, 2001 || Ondřejov || P. Kušnirák || — || align=right | 2.6 km || 
|-id=398 bgcolor=#E9E9E9
| 146398 ||  || — || August 23, 2001 || Anderson Mesa || LONEOS || — || align=right | 2.8 km || 
|-id=399 bgcolor=#fefefe
| 146399 ||  || — || August 23, 2001 || Anderson Mesa || LONEOS || V || align=right | 1.1 km || 
|-id=400 bgcolor=#E9E9E9
| 146400 ||  || — || August 23, 2001 || Anderson Mesa || LONEOS || — || align=right | 1.6 km || 
|}

146401–146500 

|-bgcolor=#E9E9E9
| 146401 ||  || — || August 21, 2001 || Palomar || NEAT || RAF || align=right | 1.6 km || 
|-id=402 bgcolor=#E9E9E9
| 146402 ||  || — || August 22, 2001 || Haleakala || NEAT || — || align=right | 1.6 km || 
|-id=403 bgcolor=#E9E9E9
| 146403 ||  || — || August 24, 2001 || Haleakala || NEAT || — || align=right | 2.2 km || 
|-id=404 bgcolor=#E9E9E9
| 146404 ||  || — || August 27, 2001 || Goodricke-Pigott || R. A. Tucker || — || align=right | 3.8 km || 
|-id=405 bgcolor=#E9E9E9
| 146405 ||  || — || August 21, 2001 || Socorro || LINEAR || — || align=right | 2.1 km || 
|-id=406 bgcolor=#E9E9E9
| 146406 ||  || — || August 22, 2001 || Socorro || LINEAR || MAR || align=right | 2.2 km || 
|-id=407 bgcolor=#E9E9E9
| 146407 ||  || — || August 22, 2001 || Socorro || LINEAR || MAR || align=right | 2.3 km || 
|-id=408 bgcolor=#E9E9E9
| 146408 ||  || — || August 22, 2001 || Socorro || LINEAR || MAR || align=right | 1.8 km || 
|-id=409 bgcolor=#E9E9E9
| 146409 ||  || — || August 22, 2001 || Socorro || LINEAR || — || align=right | 3.1 km || 
|-id=410 bgcolor=#E9E9E9
| 146410 ||  || — || August 22, 2001 || Socorro || LINEAR || — || align=right | 2.6 km || 
|-id=411 bgcolor=#E9E9E9
| 146411 ||  || — || August 22, 2001 || Socorro || LINEAR || — || align=right | 3.8 km || 
|-id=412 bgcolor=#E9E9E9
| 146412 ||  || — || August 22, 2001 || Socorro || LINEAR || — || align=right | 3.1 km || 
|-id=413 bgcolor=#d6d6d6
| 146413 ||  || — || August 22, 2001 || Palomar || NEAT || BRA || align=right | 3.2 km || 
|-id=414 bgcolor=#E9E9E9
| 146414 ||  || — || August 22, 2001 || Socorro || LINEAR || — || align=right | 2.5 km || 
|-id=415 bgcolor=#E9E9E9
| 146415 ||  || — || August 22, 2001 || Socorro || LINEAR || — || align=right | 6.0 km || 
|-id=416 bgcolor=#E9E9E9
| 146416 ||  || — || August 23, 2001 || Anderson Mesa || LONEOS || — || align=right | 2.0 km || 
|-id=417 bgcolor=#E9E9E9
| 146417 ||  || — || August 23, 2001 || Anderson Mesa || LONEOS || — || align=right | 1.7 km || 
|-id=418 bgcolor=#E9E9E9
| 146418 ||  || — || August 23, 2001 || Kitt Peak || Spacewatch || — || align=right | 1.5 km || 
|-id=419 bgcolor=#E9E9E9
| 146419 ||  || — || August 23, 2001 || Socorro || LINEAR || MAR || align=right | 2.0 km || 
|-id=420 bgcolor=#E9E9E9
| 146420 ||  || — || August 23, 2001 || Socorro || LINEAR || MAR || align=right | 2.4 km || 
|-id=421 bgcolor=#E9E9E9
| 146421 ||  || — || August 24, 2001 || Anderson Mesa || LONEOS || — || align=right | 2.2 km || 
|-id=422 bgcolor=#fefefe
| 146422 ||  || — || August 24, 2001 || Socorro || LINEAR || MAS || align=right | 1.3 km || 
|-id=423 bgcolor=#E9E9E9
| 146423 ||  || — || August 24, 2001 || Anderson Mesa || LONEOS || MAR || align=right | 2.7 km || 
|-id=424 bgcolor=#E9E9E9
| 146424 ||  || — || August 24, 2001 || Anderson Mesa || LONEOS || — || align=right | 2.2 km || 
|-id=425 bgcolor=#E9E9E9
| 146425 ||  || — || August 24, 2001 || Socorro || LINEAR || — || align=right | 2.8 km || 
|-id=426 bgcolor=#E9E9E9
| 146426 ||  || — || August 24, 2001 || Socorro || LINEAR || — || align=right | 5.6 km || 
|-id=427 bgcolor=#E9E9E9
| 146427 ||  || — || August 24, 2001 || Socorro || LINEAR || — || align=right | 3.6 km || 
|-id=428 bgcolor=#E9E9E9
| 146428 ||  || — || August 25, 2001 || Anderson Mesa || LONEOS || — || align=right | 1.9 km || 
|-id=429 bgcolor=#E9E9E9
| 146429 ||  || — || August 25, 2001 || Socorro || LINEAR || — || align=right | 3.1 km || 
|-id=430 bgcolor=#E9E9E9
| 146430 ||  || — || August 25, 2001 || Socorro || LINEAR || — || align=right | 1.8 km || 
|-id=431 bgcolor=#E9E9E9
| 146431 ||  || — || August 20, 2001 || Socorro || LINEAR || — || align=right | 2.5 km || 
|-id=432 bgcolor=#E9E9E9
| 146432 ||  || — || August 19, 2001 || Socorro || LINEAR || — || align=right | 2.0 km || 
|-id=433 bgcolor=#E9E9E9
| 146433 ||  || — || August 19, 2001 || Socorro || LINEAR || — || align=right | 4.0 km || 
|-id=434 bgcolor=#E9E9E9
| 146434 ||  || — || August 19, 2001 || Anderson Mesa || LONEOS || — || align=right | 2.7 km || 
|-id=435 bgcolor=#E9E9E9
| 146435 ||  || — || August 19, 2001 || Socorro || LINEAR || — || align=right | 5.0 km || 
|-id=436 bgcolor=#E9E9E9
| 146436 ||  || — || August 19, 2001 || Socorro || LINEAR || — || align=right | 1.5 km || 
|-id=437 bgcolor=#E9E9E9
| 146437 ||  || — || August 19, 2001 || Socorro || LINEAR || — || align=right | 3.5 km || 
|-id=438 bgcolor=#E9E9E9
| 146438 ||  || — || August 18, 2001 || Palomar || NEAT || EUN || align=right | 2.4 km || 
|-id=439 bgcolor=#E9E9E9
| 146439 ||  || — || August 18, 2001 || Palomar || NEAT || — || align=right | 2.8 km || 
|-id=440 bgcolor=#E9E9E9
| 146440 ||  || — || August 18, 2001 || Palomar || NEAT || HEN || align=right | 1.6 km || 
|-id=441 bgcolor=#fefefe
| 146441 ||  || — || August 16, 2001 || Socorro || LINEAR || — || align=right | 5.6 km || 
|-id=442 bgcolor=#fefefe
| 146442 Dwaynebrown ||  ||  || August 20, 2001 || Cerro Tololo || M. W. Buie || NYS || align=right | 1.2 km || 
|-id=443 bgcolor=#E9E9E9
| 146443 ||  || — || August 26, 2001 || Anderson Mesa || LONEOS || — || align=right | 2.0 km || 
|-id=444 bgcolor=#E9E9E9
| 146444 || 2001 RB || — || September 2, 2001 || Eskridge || G. Hug || IAN || align=right | 2.0 km || 
|-id=445 bgcolor=#E9E9E9
| 146445 ||  || — || September 7, 2001 || Socorro || LINEAR || — || align=right | 2.0 km || 
|-id=446 bgcolor=#E9E9E9
| 146446 ||  || — || September 8, 2001 || Anderson Mesa || LONEOS || — || align=right | 1.9 km || 
|-id=447 bgcolor=#fefefe
| 146447 ||  || — || September 9, 2001 || Socorro || LINEAR || ERI || align=right | 3.3 km || 
|-id=448 bgcolor=#E9E9E9
| 146448 ||  || — || September 10, 2001 || Socorro || LINEAR || HEN || align=right | 1.3 km || 
|-id=449 bgcolor=#fefefe
| 146449 ||  || — || September 7, 2001 || Socorro || LINEAR || NYS || align=right | 1.8 km || 
|-id=450 bgcolor=#E9E9E9
| 146450 ||  || — || September 7, 2001 || Socorro || LINEAR || — || align=right | 2.7 km || 
|-id=451 bgcolor=#E9E9E9
| 146451 ||  || — || September 7, 2001 || Socorro || LINEAR || — || align=right | 4.6 km || 
|-id=452 bgcolor=#E9E9E9
| 146452 ||  || — || September 7, 2001 || Socorro || LINEAR || — || align=right | 3.0 km || 
|-id=453 bgcolor=#E9E9E9
| 146453 ||  || — || September 7, 2001 || Socorro || LINEAR || — || align=right | 2.4 km || 
|-id=454 bgcolor=#E9E9E9
| 146454 ||  || — || September 7, 2001 || Socorro || LINEAR || HEN || align=right | 1.5 km || 
|-id=455 bgcolor=#E9E9E9
| 146455 ||  || — || September 7, 2001 || Socorro || LINEAR || HNS || align=right | 2.0 km || 
|-id=456 bgcolor=#E9E9E9
| 146456 ||  || — || September 8, 2001 || Socorro || LINEAR || — || align=right | 3.2 km || 
|-id=457 bgcolor=#E9E9E9
| 146457 ||  || — || September 8, 2001 || Socorro || LINEAR || — || align=right | 3.9 km || 
|-id=458 bgcolor=#E9E9E9
| 146458 ||  || — || September 8, 2001 || Socorro || LINEAR || — || align=right | 4.2 km || 
|-id=459 bgcolor=#E9E9E9
| 146459 ||  || — || September 10, 2001 || Socorro || LINEAR || — || align=right | 2.3 km || 
|-id=460 bgcolor=#E9E9E9
| 146460 ||  || — || September 12, 2001 || Socorro || LINEAR || — || align=right | 3.1 km || 
|-id=461 bgcolor=#E9E9E9
| 146461 ||  || — || September 12, 2001 || Socorro || LINEAR || — || align=right | 2.1 km || 
|-id=462 bgcolor=#E9E9E9
| 146462 ||  || — || September 12, 2001 || Socorro || LINEAR || XIZ || align=right | 2.1 km || 
|-id=463 bgcolor=#E9E9E9
| 146463 ||  || — || September 12, 2001 || Socorro || LINEAR || — || align=right | 2.3 km || 
|-id=464 bgcolor=#E9E9E9
| 146464 ||  || — || September 12, 2001 || Socorro || LINEAR || — || align=right | 3.4 km || 
|-id=465 bgcolor=#E9E9E9
| 146465 ||  || — || September 12, 2001 || Socorro || LINEAR || MRX || align=right | 4.3 km || 
|-id=466 bgcolor=#E9E9E9
| 146466 ||  || — || September 12, 2001 || Socorro || LINEAR || — || align=right | 4.7 km || 
|-id=467 bgcolor=#E9E9E9
| 146467 ||  || — || September 10, 2001 || Socorro || LINEAR || — || align=right | 4.5 km || 
|-id=468 bgcolor=#E9E9E9
| 146468 ||  || — || September 10, 2001 || Socorro || LINEAR || GEF || align=right | 2.0 km || 
|-id=469 bgcolor=#E9E9E9
| 146469 ||  || — || September 10, 2001 || Socorro || LINEAR || — || align=right | 4.2 km || 
|-id=470 bgcolor=#E9E9E9
| 146470 ||  || — || September 10, 2001 || Socorro || LINEAR || — || align=right | 2.5 km || 
|-id=471 bgcolor=#E9E9E9
| 146471 ||  || — || September 10, 2001 || Socorro || LINEAR || — || align=right | 5.2 km || 
|-id=472 bgcolor=#E9E9E9
| 146472 ||  || — || September 10, 2001 || Socorro || LINEAR || — || align=right | 4.8 km || 
|-id=473 bgcolor=#E9E9E9
| 146473 ||  || — || September 14, 2001 || Palomar || NEAT || — || align=right | 2.3 km || 
|-id=474 bgcolor=#E9E9E9
| 146474 ||  || — || September 11, 2001 || Anderson Mesa || LONEOS || — || align=right | 2.1 km || 
|-id=475 bgcolor=#E9E9E9
| 146475 ||  || — || September 11, 2001 || Anderson Mesa || LONEOS || WIT || align=right | 4.2 km || 
|-id=476 bgcolor=#fefefe
| 146476 ||  || — || September 12, 2001 || Kitt Peak || Spacewatch || — || align=right | 1.2 km || 
|-id=477 bgcolor=#E9E9E9
| 146477 ||  || — || September 12, 2001 || Socorro || LINEAR || — || align=right | 2.3 km || 
|-id=478 bgcolor=#E9E9E9
| 146478 ||  || — || September 12, 2001 || Socorro || LINEAR || RAF || align=right | 1.3 km || 
|-id=479 bgcolor=#E9E9E9
| 146479 ||  || — || September 12, 2001 || Socorro || LINEAR || — || align=right | 3.0 km || 
|-id=480 bgcolor=#E9E9E9
| 146480 ||  || — || September 12, 2001 || Socorro || LINEAR || — || align=right | 3.4 km || 
|-id=481 bgcolor=#E9E9E9
| 146481 ||  || — || September 12, 2001 || Socorro || LINEAR || — || align=right | 1.9 km || 
|-id=482 bgcolor=#fefefe
| 146482 ||  || — || September 12, 2001 || Socorro || LINEAR || V || align=right | 1.1 km || 
|-id=483 bgcolor=#E9E9E9
| 146483 ||  || — || September 12, 2001 || Socorro || LINEAR || — || align=right | 5.5 km || 
|-id=484 bgcolor=#E9E9E9
| 146484 ||  || — || September 12, 2001 || Socorro || LINEAR || — || align=right | 3.3 km || 
|-id=485 bgcolor=#E9E9E9
| 146485 ||  || — || September 8, 2001 || Socorro || LINEAR || — || align=right | 1.8 km || 
|-id=486 bgcolor=#E9E9E9
| 146486 ||  || — || September 11, 2001 || Anderson Mesa || LONEOS || — || align=right | 3.0 km || 
|-id=487 bgcolor=#E9E9E9
| 146487 ||  || — || September 11, 2001 || Anderson Mesa || LONEOS || — || align=right | 1.7 km || 
|-id=488 bgcolor=#fefefe
| 146488 ||  || — || September 13, 2001 || Palomar || NEAT || — || align=right | 1.5 km || 
|-id=489 bgcolor=#E9E9E9
| 146489 ||  || — || September 17, 2001 || Desert Eagle || W. K. Y. Yeung || — || align=right | 2.1 km || 
|-id=490 bgcolor=#E9E9E9
| 146490 ||  || — || September 16, 2001 || Socorro || LINEAR || — || align=right | 3.2 km || 
|-id=491 bgcolor=#E9E9E9
| 146491 ||  || — || September 16, 2001 || Socorro || LINEAR || — || align=right | 1.9 km || 
|-id=492 bgcolor=#E9E9E9
| 146492 ||  || — || September 16, 2001 || Socorro || LINEAR || — || align=right | 2.4 km || 
|-id=493 bgcolor=#E9E9E9
| 146493 ||  || — || September 16, 2001 || Socorro || LINEAR || — || align=right | 2.9 km || 
|-id=494 bgcolor=#E9E9E9
| 146494 ||  || — || September 16, 2001 || Socorro || LINEAR || — || align=right | 3.6 km || 
|-id=495 bgcolor=#E9E9E9
| 146495 ||  || — || September 16, 2001 || Socorro || LINEAR || HEN || align=right | 1.6 km || 
|-id=496 bgcolor=#E9E9E9
| 146496 ||  || — || September 16, 2001 || Socorro || LINEAR || — || align=right | 2.3 km || 
|-id=497 bgcolor=#E9E9E9
| 146497 ||  || — || September 16, 2001 || Socorro || LINEAR || — || align=right | 1.4 km || 
|-id=498 bgcolor=#E9E9E9
| 146498 ||  || — || September 16, 2001 || Socorro || LINEAR || — || align=right | 2.0 km || 
|-id=499 bgcolor=#E9E9E9
| 146499 ||  || — || September 16, 2001 || Socorro || LINEAR || JUN || align=right | 2.1 km || 
|-id=500 bgcolor=#E9E9E9
| 146500 ||  || — || September 16, 2001 || Socorro || LINEAR || — || align=right | 2.5 km || 
|}

146501–146600 

|-bgcolor=#E9E9E9
| 146501 ||  || — || September 16, 2001 || Socorro || LINEAR || MAR || align=right | 1.9 km || 
|-id=502 bgcolor=#E9E9E9
| 146502 ||  || — || September 16, 2001 || Socorro || LINEAR || — || align=right | 2.0 km || 
|-id=503 bgcolor=#E9E9E9
| 146503 ||  || — || September 16, 2001 || Socorro || LINEAR || — || align=right | 1.8 km || 
|-id=504 bgcolor=#E9E9E9
| 146504 ||  || — || September 16, 2001 || Socorro || LINEAR || — || align=right | 3.3 km || 
|-id=505 bgcolor=#E9E9E9
| 146505 ||  || — || September 16, 2001 || Socorro || LINEAR || — || align=right | 3.1 km || 
|-id=506 bgcolor=#E9E9E9
| 146506 ||  || — || September 16, 2001 || Socorro || LINEAR || — || align=right | 3.9 km || 
|-id=507 bgcolor=#E9E9E9
| 146507 ||  || — || September 17, 2001 || Socorro || LINEAR || NEM || align=right | 5.1 km || 
|-id=508 bgcolor=#E9E9E9
| 146508 ||  || — || September 17, 2001 || Socorro || LINEAR || — || align=right | 5.1 km || 
|-id=509 bgcolor=#E9E9E9
| 146509 ||  || — || September 19, 2001 || Anderson Mesa || LONEOS || — || align=right | 4.6 km || 
|-id=510 bgcolor=#E9E9E9
| 146510 ||  || — || September 20, 2001 || Socorro || LINEAR || — || align=right | 2.7 km || 
|-id=511 bgcolor=#E9E9E9
| 146511 ||  || — || September 20, 2001 || Socorro || LINEAR || — || align=right | 2.5 km || 
|-id=512 bgcolor=#E9E9E9
| 146512 ||  || — || September 20, 2001 || Socorro || LINEAR || — || align=right | 1.1 km || 
|-id=513 bgcolor=#E9E9E9
| 146513 ||  || — || September 20, 2001 || Socorro || LINEAR || — || align=right | 3.0 km || 
|-id=514 bgcolor=#E9E9E9
| 146514 ||  || — || September 16, 2001 || Socorro || LINEAR || — || align=right | 1.7 km || 
|-id=515 bgcolor=#E9E9E9
| 146515 ||  || — || September 16, 2001 || Socorro || LINEAR || — || align=right | 1.8 km || 
|-id=516 bgcolor=#E9E9E9
| 146516 ||  || — || September 16, 2001 || Socorro || LINEAR || — || align=right | 3.3 km || 
|-id=517 bgcolor=#E9E9E9
| 146517 ||  || — || September 16, 2001 || Socorro || LINEAR || — || align=right | 4.1 km || 
|-id=518 bgcolor=#E9E9E9
| 146518 ||  || — || September 16, 2001 || Socorro || LINEAR || — || align=right | 3.5 km || 
|-id=519 bgcolor=#E9E9E9
| 146519 ||  || — || September 16, 2001 || Socorro || LINEAR || — || align=right | 2.6 km || 
|-id=520 bgcolor=#E9E9E9
| 146520 ||  || — || September 16, 2001 || Socorro || LINEAR || — || align=right | 3.6 km || 
|-id=521 bgcolor=#E9E9E9
| 146521 ||  || — || September 16, 2001 || Socorro || LINEAR || — || align=right | 2.1 km || 
|-id=522 bgcolor=#E9E9E9
| 146522 ||  || — || September 17, 2001 || Socorro || LINEAR || — || align=right | 4.1 km || 
|-id=523 bgcolor=#E9E9E9
| 146523 ||  || — || September 17, 2001 || Socorro || LINEAR || — || align=right | 1.8 km || 
|-id=524 bgcolor=#E9E9E9
| 146524 ||  || — || September 17, 2001 || Socorro || LINEAR || GEF || align=right | 2.6 km || 
|-id=525 bgcolor=#E9E9E9
| 146525 ||  || — || September 17, 2001 || Socorro || LINEAR || — || align=right | 3.0 km || 
|-id=526 bgcolor=#E9E9E9
| 146526 ||  || — || September 17, 2001 || Socorro || LINEAR || — || align=right | 2.2 km || 
|-id=527 bgcolor=#E9E9E9
| 146527 ||  || — || September 17, 2001 || Socorro || LINEAR || — || align=right | 4.1 km || 
|-id=528 bgcolor=#E9E9E9
| 146528 ||  || — || September 17, 2001 || Socorro || LINEAR || WIT || align=right | 1.5 km || 
|-id=529 bgcolor=#E9E9E9
| 146529 ||  || — || September 17, 2001 || Socorro || LINEAR || — || align=right | 3.8 km || 
|-id=530 bgcolor=#E9E9E9
| 146530 ||  || — || September 19, 2001 || Socorro || LINEAR || — || align=right | 2.1 km || 
|-id=531 bgcolor=#E9E9E9
| 146531 ||  || — || September 19, 2001 || Socorro || LINEAR || — || align=right | 1.7 km || 
|-id=532 bgcolor=#E9E9E9
| 146532 ||  || — || September 19, 2001 || Socorro || LINEAR || — || align=right | 2.3 km || 
|-id=533 bgcolor=#E9E9E9
| 146533 ||  || — || September 19, 2001 || Socorro || LINEAR || HEN || align=right | 1.9 km || 
|-id=534 bgcolor=#E9E9E9
| 146534 ||  || — || September 19, 2001 || Socorro || LINEAR || PAD || align=right | 3.3 km || 
|-id=535 bgcolor=#E9E9E9
| 146535 ||  || — || September 19, 2001 || Socorro || LINEAR || — || align=right | 2.2 km || 
|-id=536 bgcolor=#d6d6d6
| 146536 ||  || — || September 19, 2001 || Socorro || LINEAR || KOR || align=right | 2.6 km || 
|-id=537 bgcolor=#d6d6d6
| 146537 ||  || — || September 19, 2001 || Socorro || LINEAR || KOR || align=right | 2.7 km || 
|-id=538 bgcolor=#E9E9E9
| 146538 ||  || — || September 19, 2001 || Socorro || LINEAR || — || align=right | 4.0 km || 
|-id=539 bgcolor=#E9E9E9
| 146539 ||  || — || September 19, 2001 || Socorro || LINEAR || — || align=right | 2.5 km || 
|-id=540 bgcolor=#E9E9E9
| 146540 ||  || — || September 19, 2001 || Socorro || LINEAR || — || align=right | 3.4 km || 
|-id=541 bgcolor=#E9E9E9
| 146541 ||  || — || September 19, 2001 || Socorro || LINEAR || — || align=right | 2.6 km || 
|-id=542 bgcolor=#E9E9E9
| 146542 ||  || — || September 25, 2001 || Desert Eagle || W. K. Y. Yeung || — || align=right | 1.7 km || 
|-id=543 bgcolor=#E9E9E9
| 146543 ||  || — || September 21, 2001 || Palomar || NEAT || — || align=right | 4.4 km || 
|-id=544 bgcolor=#E9E9E9
| 146544 ||  || — || September 26, 2001 || Socorro || LINEAR || — || align=right | 7.5 km || 
|-id=545 bgcolor=#E9E9E9
| 146545 ||  || — || September 21, 2001 || Anderson Mesa || LONEOS || — || align=right | 3.9 km || 
|-id=546 bgcolor=#E9E9E9
| 146546 ||  || — || September 21, 2001 || Anderson Mesa || LONEOS || — || align=right | 4.5 km || 
|-id=547 bgcolor=#E9E9E9
| 146547 ||  || — || September 21, 2001 || Socorro || LINEAR || — || align=right | 3.4 km || 
|-id=548 bgcolor=#E9E9E9
| 146548 ||  || — || September 28, 2001 || Fountain Hills || C. W. Juels, P. R. Holvorcem || — || align=right | 7.6 km || 
|-id=549 bgcolor=#E9E9E9
| 146549 ||  || — || September 21, 2001 || Palomar || NEAT || — || align=right | 3.2 km || 
|-id=550 bgcolor=#E9E9E9
| 146550 ||  || — || September 23, 2001 || Anderson Mesa || LONEOS || MAR || align=right | 2.1 km || 
|-id=551 bgcolor=#E9E9E9
| 146551 ||  || — || September 20, 2001 || Socorro || LINEAR || — || align=right | 2.2 km || 
|-id=552 bgcolor=#fefefe
| 146552 ||  || — || September 20, 2001 || Socorro || LINEAR || NYS || align=right | 1.3 km || 
|-id=553 bgcolor=#E9E9E9
| 146553 ||  || — || September 20, 2001 || Socorro || LINEAR || — || align=right | 2.8 km || 
|-id=554 bgcolor=#E9E9E9
| 146554 ||  || — || September 25, 2001 || Socorro || LINEAR || — || align=right | 4.6 km || 
|-id=555 bgcolor=#E9E9E9
| 146555 ||  || — || September 19, 2001 || Socorro || LINEAR || — || align=right | 3.6 km || 
|-id=556 bgcolor=#E9E9E9
| 146556 ||  || — || September 20, 2001 || Socorro || LINEAR || — || align=right | 2.7 km || 
|-id=557 bgcolor=#E9E9E9
| 146557 ||  || — || September 21, 2001 || Socorro || LINEAR || — || align=right | 1.8 km || 
|-id=558 bgcolor=#E9E9E9
| 146558 ||  || — || September 20, 2001 || Powell || Powell Obs. || — || align=right | 3.3 km || 
|-id=559 bgcolor=#E9E9E9
| 146559 ||  || — || September 23, 2001 || Anderson Mesa || LONEOS || 526 || align=right | 3.9 km || 
|-id=560 bgcolor=#E9E9E9
| 146560 ||  || — || September 20, 2001 || Socorro || LINEAR || — || align=right | 1.7 km || 
|-id=561 bgcolor=#E9E9E9
| 146561 ||  || — || October 7, 2001 || Palomar || NEAT || — || align=right | 2.5 km || 
|-id=562 bgcolor=#E9E9E9
| 146562 ||  || — || October 10, 2001 || Palomar || NEAT || — || align=right | 2.1 km || 
|-id=563 bgcolor=#E9E9E9
| 146563 ||  || — || October 10, 2001 || Palomar || NEAT || — || align=right | 1.6 km || 
|-id=564 bgcolor=#E9E9E9
| 146564 ||  || — || October 9, 2001 || Socorro || LINEAR || — || align=right | 3.9 km || 
|-id=565 bgcolor=#E9E9E9
| 146565 ||  || — || October 11, 2001 || Socorro || LINEAR || MAR || align=right | 2.0 km || 
|-id=566 bgcolor=#E9E9E9
| 146566 ||  || — || October 14, 2001 || Socorro || LINEAR || — || align=right | 2.2 km || 
|-id=567 bgcolor=#E9E9E9
| 146567 ||  || — || October 15, 2001 || Socorro || LINEAR || HNS || align=right | 2.3 km || 
|-id=568 bgcolor=#E9E9E9
| 146568 ||  || — || October 14, 2001 || Socorro || LINEAR || — || align=right | 1.9 km || 
|-id=569 bgcolor=#E9E9E9
| 146569 ||  || — || October 13, 2001 || Socorro || LINEAR || — || align=right | 2.5 km || 
|-id=570 bgcolor=#E9E9E9
| 146570 ||  || — || October 13, 2001 || Socorro || LINEAR || — || align=right | 3.3 km || 
|-id=571 bgcolor=#E9E9E9
| 146571 ||  || — || October 13, 2001 || Socorro || LINEAR || — || align=right | 2.8 km || 
|-id=572 bgcolor=#E9E9E9
| 146572 ||  || — || October 13, 2001 || Socorro || LINEAR || — || align=right | 3.0 km || 
|-id=573 bgcolor=#E9E9E9
| 146573 ||  || — || October 13, 2001 || Socorro || LINEAR || AGN || align=right | 1.9 km || 
|-id=574 bgcolor=#E9E9E9
| 146574 ||  || — || October 13, 2001 || Socorro || LINEAR || — || align=right | 3.4 km || 
|-id=575 bgcolor=#E9E9E9
| 146575 ||  || — || October 13, 2001 || Socorro || LINEAR || MAR || align=right | 2.3 km || 
|-id=576 bgcolor=#E9E9E9
| 146576 ||  || — || October 13, 2001 || Socorro || LINEAR || PAD || align=right | 4.9 km || 
|-id=577 bgcolor=#E9E9E9
| 146577 ||  || — || October 13, 2001 || Socorro || LINEAR || — || align=right | 4.4 km || 
|-id=578 bgcolor=#E9E9E9
| 146578 ||  || — || October 14, 2001 || Socorro || LINEAR || PAD || align=right | 3.0 km || 
|-id=579 bgcolor=#E9E9E9
| 146579 ||  || — || October 14, 2001 || Socorro || LINEAR || — || align=right | 4.0 km || 
|-id=580 bgcolor=#E9E9E9
| 146580 ||  || — || October 14, 2001 || Socorro || LINEAR || — || align=right | 2.2 km || 
|-id=581 bgcolor=#E9E9E9
| 146581 ||  || — || October 14, 2001 || Socorro || LINEAR || — || align=right | 3.4 km || 
|-id=582 bgcolor=#E9E9E9
| 146582 ||  || — || October 14, 2001 || Socorro || LINEAR || — || align=right | 3.0 km || 
|-id=583 bgcolor=#E9E9E9
| 146583 ||  || — || October 14, 2001 || Socorro || LINEAR || — || align=right | 3.4 km || 
|-id=584 bgcolor=#E9E9E9
| 146584 ||  || — || October 15, 2001 || Socorro || LINEAR || — || align=right | 3.8 km || 
|-id=585 bgcolor=#E9E9E9
| 146585 ||  || — || October 15, 2001 || Desert Eagle || W. K. Y. Yeung || — || align=right | 4.3 km || 
|-id=586 bgcolor=#E9E9E9
| 146586 ||  || — || October 6, 2001 || Palomar || NEAT || ADE || align=right | 4.3 km || 
|-id=587 bgcolor=#E9E9E9
| 146587 ||  || — || October 12, 2001 || Haleakala || NEAT || GEF || align=right | 4.9 km || 
|-id=588 bgcolor=#E9E9E9
| 146588 ||  || — || October 13, 2001 || Kitt Peak || Spacewatch || — || align=right | 2.7 km || 
|-id=589 bgcolor=#E9E9E9
| 146589 ||  || — || October 10, 2001 || Palomar || NEAT || AER || align=right | 2.5 km || 
|-id=590 bgcolor=#E9E9E9
| 146590 ||  || — || October 10, 2001 || Palomar || NEAT || — || align=right | 2.7 km || 
|-id=591 bgcolor=#E9E9E9
| 146591 ||  || — || October 10, 2001 || Palomar || NEAT || — || align=right | 2.5 km || 
|-id=592 bgcolor=#E9E9E9
| 146592 ||  || — || October 10, 2001 || Palomar || NEAT || — || align=right | 2.2 km || 
|-id=593 bgcolor=#E9E9E9
| 146593 ||  || — || October 11, 2001 || Palomar || NEAT || — || align=right | 2.4 km || 
|-id=594 bgcolor=#E9E9E9
| 146594 ||  || — || October 11, 2001 || Palomar || NEAT || — || align=right | 1.9 km || 
|-id=595 bgcolor=#E9E9E9
| 146595 ||  || — || October 14, 2001 || Kitt Peak || Spacewatch || — || align=right | 2.3 km || 
|-id=596 bgcolor=#E9E9E9
| 146596 ||  || — || October 13, 2001 || Palomar || NEAT || EUN || align=right | 2.1 km || 
|-id=597 bgcolor=#E9E9E9
| 146597 ||  || — || October 15, 2001 || Palomar || NEAT || — || align=right | 6.2 km || 
|-id=598 bgcolor=#d6d6d6
| 146598 ||  || — || October 15, 2001 || Socorro || LINEAR || BRA || align=right | 3.3 km || 
|-id=599 bgcolor=#E9E9E9
| 146599 ||  || — || October 15, 2001 || Socorro || LINEAR || GEF || align=right | 2.5 km || 
|-id=600 bgcolor=#E9E9E9
| 146600 ||  || — || October 15, 2001 || Socorro || LINEAR || CLO || align=right | 3.3 km || 
|}

146601–146700 

|-bgcolor=#E9E9E9
| 146601 ||  || — || October 14, 2001 || Socorro || LINEAR || — || align=right | 2.8 km || 
|-id=602 bgcolor=#E9E9E9
| 146602 ||  || — || October 14, 2001 || Socorro || LINEAR || — || align=right | 4.0 km || 
|-id=603 bgcolor=#E9E9E9
| 146603 ||  || — || October 14, 2001 || Socorro || LINEAR || — || align=right | 2.9 km || 
|-id=604 bgcolor=#E9E9E9
| 146604 ||  || — || October 15, 2001 || Socorro || LINEAR || — || align=right | 3.9 km || 
|-id=605 bgcolor=#E9E9E9
| 146605 ||  || — || October 15, 2001 || Socorro || LINEAR || EUN || align=right | 3.0 km || 
|-id=606 bgcolor=#E9E9E9
| 146606 ||  || — || October 14, 2001 || Palomar || NEAT || — || align=right | 2.3 km || 
|-id=607 bgcolor=#E9E9E9
| 146607 ||  || — || October 14, 2001 || Socorro || LINEAR || — || align=right | 2.7 km || 
|-id=608 bgcolor=#E9E9E9
| 146608 ||  || — || October 11, 2001 || Socorro || LINEAR || — || align=right | 3.8 km || 
|-id=609 bgcolor=#E9E9E9
| 146609 ||  || — || October 11, 2001 || Socorro || LINEAR || — || align=right | 4.7 km || 
|-id=610 bgcolor=#E9E9E9
| 146610 ||  || — || October 11, 2001 || Socorro || LINEAR || — || align=right | 4.3 km || 
|-id=611 bgcolor=#E9E9E9
| 146611 ||  || — || October 11, 2001 || Socorro || LINEAR || — || align=right | 2.3 km || 
|-id=612 bgcolor=#E9E9E9
| 146612 ||  || — || October 11, 2001 || Kitt Peak || Spacewatch || — || align=right | 3.0 km || 
|-id=613 bgcolor=#E9E9E9
| 146613 ||  || — || October 13, 2001 || Palomar || NEAT || — || align=right | 3.7 km || 
|-id=614 bgcolor=#E9E9E9
| 146614 ||  || — || October 13, 2001 || Haleakala || NEAT || — || align=right | 2.9 km || 
|-id=615 bgcolor=#E9E9E9
| 146615 ||  || — || October 13, 2001 || Anderson Mesa || LONEOS || CLO || align=right | 3.6 km || 
|-id=616 bgcolor=#E9E9E9
| 146616 ||  || — || October 13, 2001 || Palomar || NEAT || — || align=right | 2.2 km || 
|-id=617 bgcolor=#E9E9E9
| 146617 ||  || — || October 14, 2001 || Socorro || LINEAR || — || align=right | 3.9 km || 
|-id=618 bgcolor=#E9E9E9
| 146618 ||  || — || October 14, 2001 || Palomar || NEAT || EUN || align=right | 2.0 km || 
|-id=619 bgcolor=#E9E9E9
| 146619 ||  || — || October 15, 2001 || Kitt Peak || Spacewatch || — || align=right | 4.3 km || 
|-id=620 bgcolor=#E9E9E9
| 146620 ||  || — || October 15, 2001 || Palomar || NEAT || MAR || align=right | 2.0 km || 
|-id=621 bgcolor=#E9E9E9
| 146621 ||  || — || October 15, 2001 || Desert Eagle || W. K. Y. Yeung || NEM || align=right | 3.2 km || 
|-id=622 bgcolor=#d6d6d6
| 146622 ||  || — || October 15, 2001 || Kitt Peak || Spacewatch || — || align=right | 3.0 km || 
|-id=623 bgcolor=#E9E9E9
| 146623 ||  || — || October 8, 2001 || Palomar || NEAT || MAR || align=right | 2.1 km || 
|-id=624 bgcolor=#E9E9E9
| 146624 ||  || — || October 11, 2001 || Palomar || NEAT || — || align=right | 3.0 km || 
|-id=625 bgcolor=#d6d6d6
| 146625 ||  || — || October 14, 2001 || Socorro || LINEAR || — || align=right | 5.6 km || 
|-id=626 bgcolor=#E9E9E9
| 146626 ||  || — || October 16, 2001 || Socorro || LINEAR || HOF || align=right | 3.9 km || 
|-id=627 bgcolor=#d6d6d6
| 146627 ||  || — || October 23, 2001 || Desert Eagle || W. K. Y. Yeung || EUP || align=right | 10 km || 
|-id=628 bgcolor=#E9E9E9
| 146628 ||  || — || October 24, 2001 || Desert Eagle || W. K. Y. Yeung || — || align=right | 2.8 km || 
|-id=629 bgcolor=#E9E9E9
| 146629 ||  || — || October 16, 2001 || Palomar || NEAT || PAD || align=right | 4.2 km || 
|-id=630 bgcolor=#E9E9E9
| 146630 ||  || — || October 18, 2001 || Socorro || LINEAR || GEF || align=right | 4.2 km || 
|-id=631 bgcolor=#E9E9E9
| 146631 ||  || — || October 16, 2001 || Socorro || LINEAR || EUN || align=right | 2.9 km || 
|-id=632 bgcolor=#E9E9E9
| 146632 ||  || — || October 16, 2001 || Socorro || LINEAR || GEF || align=right | 2.4 km || 
|-id=633 bgcolor=#E9E9E9
| 146633 ||  || — || October 17, 2001 || Socorro || LINEAR || — || align=right | 3.2 km || 
|-id=634 bgcolor=#E9E9E9
| 146634 ||  || — || October 17, 2001 || Socorro || LINEAR || HEN || align=right | 1.7 km || 
|-id=635 bgcolor=#E9E9E9
| 146635 ||  || — || October 17, 2001 || Socorro || LINEAR || PAD || align=right | 4.5 km || 
|-id=636 bgcolor=#E9E9E9
| 146636 ||  || — || October 17, 2001 || Socorro || LINEAR || — || align=right | 3.9 km || 
|-id=637 bgcolor=#E9E9E9
| 146637 ||  || — || October 17, 2001 || Socorro || LINEAR || HEN || align=right | 1.6 km || 
|-id=638 bgcolor=#E9E9E9
| 146638 ||  || — || October 17, 2001 || Socorro || LINEAR || — || align=right | 3.8 km || 
|-id=639 bgcolor=#E9E9E9
| 146639 ||  || — || October 17, 2001 || Socorro || LINEAR || — || align=right | 4.1 km || 
|-id=640 bgcolor=#E9E9E9
| 146640 ||  || — || October 17, 2001 || Socorro || LINEAR || — || align=right | 2.1 km || 
|-id=641 bgcolor=#E9E9E9
| 146641 ||  || — || October 17, 2001 || Socorro || LINEAR || AGN || align=right | 2.4 km || 
|-id=642 bgcolor=#E9E9E9
| 146642 ||  || — || October 17, 2001 || Socorro || LINEAR || — || align=right | 3.5 km || 
|-id=643 bgcolor=#E9E9E9
| 146643 ||  || — || October 17, 2001 || Socorro || LINEAR || EUN || align=right | 2.2 km || 
|-id=644 bgcolor=#E9E9E9
| 146644 ||  || — || October 17, 2001 || Socorro || LINEAR || — || align=right | 3.8 km || 
|-id=645 bgcolor=#E9E9E9
| 146645 ||  || — || October 20, 2001 || Socorro || LINEAR || — || align=right | 1.8 km || 
|-id=646 bgcolor=#E9E9E9
| 146646 ||  || — || October 20, 2001 || Socorro || LINEAR || HEN || align=right | 1.9 km || 
|-id=647 bgcolor=#E9E9E9
| 146647 ||  || — || October 20, 2001 || Socorro || LINEAR || — || align=right | 2.1 km || 
|-id=648 bgcolor=#E9E9E9
| 146648 ||  || — || October 20, 2001 || Socorro || LINEAR || — || align=right | 2.5 km || 
|-id=649 bgcolor=#E9E9E9
| 146649 ||  || — || October 20, 2001 || Haleakala || NEAT || ADE || align=right | 3.6 km || 
|-id=650 bgcolor=#E9E9E9
| 146650 ||  || — || October 18, 2001 || Palomar || NEAT || HEN || align=right | 2.4 km || 
|-id=651 bgcolor=#E9E9E9
| 146651 ||  || — || October 19, 2001 || Haleakala || NEAT || — || align=right | 4.8 km || 
|-id=652 bgcolor=#E9E9E9
| 146652 ||  || — || October 17, 2001 || Socorro || LINEAR || — || align=right | 4.2 km || 
|-id=653 bgcolor=#E9E9E9
| 146653 ||  || — || October 20, 2001 || Socorro || LINEAR || — || align=right | 2.5 km || 
|-id=654 bgcolor=#E9E9E9
| 146654 ||  || — || October 20, 2001 || Socorro || LINEAR || — || align=right | 1.9 km || 
|-id=655 bgcolor=#E9E9E9
| 146655 ||  || — || October 20, 2001 || Socorro || LINEAR || — || align=right | 6.2 km || 
|-id=656 bgcolor=#E9E9E9
| 146656 ||  || — || October 20, 2001 || Socorro || LINEAR || AST || align=right | 3.4 km || 
|-id=657 bgcolor=#d6d6d6
| 146657 ||  || — || October 22, 2001 || Socorro || LINEAR || K-2 || align=right | 2.1 km || 
|-id=658 bgcolor=#E9E9E9
| 146658 ||  || — || October 22, 2001 || Socorro || LINEAR || — || align=right | 4.3 km || 
|-id=659 bgcolor=#E9E9E9
| 146659 ||  || — || October 22, 2001 || Socorro || LINEAR || — || align=right | 4.7 km || 
|-id=660 bgcolor=#E9E9E9
| 146660 ||  || — || October 20, 2001 || Socorro || LINEAR || — || align=right | 3.8 km || 
|-id=661 bgcolor=#fefefe
| 146661 ||  || — || October 20, 2001 || Socorro || LINEAR || MAS || align=right | 1.4 km || 
|-id=662 bgcolor=#E9E9E9
| 146662 ||  || — || October 21, 2001 || Socorro || LINEAR || — || align=right | 2.3 km || 
|-id=663 bgcolor=#E9E9E9
| 146663 ||  || — || October 23, 2001 || Socorro || LINEAR || HOF || align=right | 4.2 km || 
|-id=664 bgcolor=#E9E9E9
| 146664 ||  || — || October 23, 2001 || Socorro || LINEAR || GEF || align=right | 2.0 km || 
|-id=665 bgcolor=#E9E9E9
| 146665 ||  || — || October 23, 2001 || Socorro || LINEAR || — || align=right | 3.9 km || 
|-id=666 bgcolor=#E9E9E9
| 146666 ||  || — || October 23, 2001 || Socorro || LINEAR || — || align=right | 3.8 km || 
|-id=667 bgcolor=#fefefe
| 146667 ||  || — || October 17, 2001 || Palomar || NEAT || — || align=right | 2.0 km || 
|-id=668 bgcolor=#E9E9E9
| 146668 ||  || — || October 19, 2001 || Socorro || LINEAR || — || align=right | 2.5 km || 
|-id=669 bgcolor=#E9E9E9
| 146669 ||  || — || October 18, 2001 || Palomar || NEAT || — || align=right | 3.1 km || 
|-id=670 bgcolor=#E9E9E9
| 146670 ||  || — || October 18, 2001 || Palomar || NEAT || — || align=right | 3.6 km || 
|-id=671 bgcolor=#E9E9E9
| 146671 ||  || — || October 17, 2001 || Socorro || LINEAR || GEF || align=right | 2.0 km || 
|-id=672 bgcolor=#E9E9E9
| 146672 ||  || — || October 19, 2001 || Palomar || NEAT || HEN || align=right | 1.5 km || 
|-id=673 bgcolor=#E9E9E9
| 146673 ||  || — || October 19, 2001 || Palomar || NEAT || AGN || align=right | 1.8 km || 
|-id=674 bgcolor=#E9E9E9
| 146674 ||  || — || October 19, 2001 || Palomar || NEAT || AGN || align=right | 2.0 km || 
|-id=675 bgcolor=#E9E9E9
| 146675 ||  || — || October 23, 2001 || Socorro || LINEAR || — || align=right | 2.3 km || 
|-id=676 bgcolor=#d6d6d6
| 146676 ||  || — || October 24, 2001 || Palomar || NEAT || — || align=right | 3.7 km || 
|-id=677 bgcolor=#E9E9E9
| 146677 ||  || — || October 24, 2001 || Socorro || LINEAR || — || align=right | 3.6 km || 
|-id=678 bgcolor=#E9E9E9
| 146678 ||  || — || October 23, 2001 || Socorro || LINEAR || AST || align=right | 4.0 km || 
|-id=679 bgcolor=#d6d6d6
| 146679 ||  || — || October 28, 2001 || Palomar || NEAT || — || align=right | 5.3 km || 
|-id=680 bgcolor=#E9E9E9
| 146680 ||  || — || November 9, 2001 || Socorro || LINEAR || — || align=right | 1.6 km || 
|-id=681 bgcolor=#d6d6d6
| 146681 ||  || — || November 10, 2001 || Socorro || LINEAR || BRA || align=right | 3.5 km || 
|-id=682 bgcolor=#E9E9E9
| 146682 ||  || — || November 10, 2001 || Socorro || LINEAR || — || align=right | 2.7 km || 
|-id=683 bgcolor=#E9E9E9
| 146683 ||  || — || November 9, 2001 || Socorro || LINEAR || — || align=right | 4.5 km || 
|-id=684 bgcolor=#E9E9E9
| 146684 ||  || — || November 9, 2001 || Socorro || LINEAR || — || align=right | 2.5 km || 
|-id=685 bgcolor=#E9E9E9
| 146685 ||  || — || November 9, 2001 || Socorro || LINEAR || — || align=right | 3.5 km || 
|-id=686 bgcolor=#E9E9E9
| 146686 ||  || — || November 9, 2001 || Socorro || LINEAR || — || align=right | 1.9 km || 
|-id=687 bgcolor=#E9E9E9
| 146687 ||  || — || November 9, 2001 || Socorro || LINEAR || — || align=right | 3.6 km || 
|-id=688 bgcolor=#E9E9E9
| 146688 ||  || — || November 9, 2001 || Socorro || LINEAR || — || align=right | 2.2 km || 
|-id=689 bgcolor=#E9E9E9
| 146689 ||  || — || November 10, 2001 || Socorro || LINEAR || — || align=right | 2.5 km || 
|-id=690 bgcolor=#E9E9E9
| 146690 ||  || — || November 10, 2001 || Socorro || LINEAR || — || align=right | 3.2 km || 
|-id=691 bgcolor=#E9E9E9
| 146691 ||  || — || November 10, 2001 || Socorro || LINEAR || — || align=right | 2.9 km || 
|-id=692 bgcolor=#E9E9E9
| 146692 ||  || — || November 11, 2001 || Socorro || LINEAR || — || align=right | 2.2 km || 
|-id=693 bgcolor=#E9E9E9
| 146693 ||  || — || November 11, 2001 || Socorro || LINEAR || — || align=right | 3.1 km || 
|-id=694 bgcolor=#E9E9E9
| 146694 ||  || — || November 11, 2001 || Socorro || LINEAR || — || align=right | 3.9 km || 
|-id=695 bgcolor=#fefefe
| 146695 ||  || — || November 11, 2001 || Socorro || LINEAR || H || align=right | 1.5 km || 
|-id=696 bgcolor=#E9E9E9
| 146696 ||  || — || November 12, 2001 || Kvistaberg || UDAS || — || align=right | 2.8 km || 
|-id=697 bgcolor=#E9E9E9
| 146697 ||  || — || November 11, 2001 || Socorro || LINEAR || — || align=right | 2.9 km || 
|-id=698 bgcolor=#E9E9E9
| 146698 ||  || — || November 12, 2001 || Haleakala || NEAT || — || align=right | 3.0 km || 
|-id=699 bgcolor=#E9E9E9
| 146699 ||  || — || November 12, 2001 || Anderson Mesa || LONEOS || — || align=right | 5.2 km || 
|-id=700 bgcolor=#E9E9E9
| 146700 ||  || — || November 12, 2001 || Socorro || LINEAR || — || align=right | 2.9 km || 
|}

146701–146800 

|-bgcolor=#E9E9E9
| 146701 ||  || — || November 12, 2001 || Socorro || LINEAR || HOF || align=right | 5.3 km || 
|-id=702 bgcolor=#E9E9E9
| 146702 ||  || — || November 12, 2001 || Socorro || LINEAR || — || align=right | 2.9 km || 
|-id=703 bgcolor=#E9E9E9
| 146703 ||  || — || November 12, 2001 || Socorro || LINEAR || AGN || align=right | 2.1 km || 
|-id=704 bgcolor=#d6d6d6
| 146704 ||  || — || November 12, 2001 || Socorro || LINEAR || KAR || align=right | 2.1 km || 
|-id=705 bgcolor=#E9E9E9
| 146705 ||  || — || November 11, 2001 || Kitt Peak || Spacewatch || — || align=right | 3.7 km || 
|-id=706 bgcolor=#E9E9E9
| 146706 ||  || — || November 17, 2001 || Socorro || LINEAR || GEF || align=right | 2.2 km || 
|-id=707 bgcolor=#E9E9E9
| 146707 ||  || — || November 17, 2001 || Socorro || LINEAR || — || align=right | 7.1 km || 
|-id=708 bgcolor=#E9E9E9
| 146708 ||  || — || November 17, 2001 || Socorro || LINEAR || — || align=right | 3.2 km || 
|-id=709 bgcolor=#E9E9E9
| 146709 ||  || — || November 17, 2001 || Socorro || LINEAR || WIT || align=right | 1.9 km || 
|-id=710 bgcolor=#E9E9E9
| 146710 ||  || — || November 17, 2001 || Socorro || LINEAR || — || align=right | 3.9 km || 
|-id=711 bgcolor=#E9E9E9
| 146711 ||  || — || November 17, 2001 || Socorro || LINEAR || — || align=right | 3.1 km || 
|-id=712 bgcolor=#E9E9E9
| 146712 ||  || — || November 17, 2001 || Socorro || LINEAR || — || align=right | 4.8 km || 
|-id=713 bgcolor=#E9E9E9
| 146713 ||  || — || November 17, 2001 || Socorro || LINEAR || — || align=right | 4.2 km || 
|-id=714 bgcolor=#E9E9E9
| 146714 ||  || — || November 17, 2001 || Socorro || LINEAR || — || align=right | 4.0 km || 
|-id=715 bgcolor=#E9E9E9
| 146715 ||  || — || November 17, 2001 || Socorro || LINEAR || INO || align=right | 2.2 km || 
|-id=716 bgcolor=#E9E9E9
| 146716 ||  || — || November 19, 2001 || Socorro || LINEAR || — || align=right | 1.8 km || 
|-id=717 bgcolor=#E9E9E9
| 146717 ||  || — || November 19, 2001 || Socorro || LINEAR || HEN || align=right | 1.8 km || 
|-id=718 bgcolor=#E9E9E9
| 146718 ||  || — || November 20, 2001 || Socorro || LINEAR || WIT || align=right | 1.4 km || 
|-id=719 bgcolor=#d6d6d6
| 146719 ||  || — || November 20, 2001 || Socorro || LINEAR || — || align=right | 4.0 km || 
|-id=720 bgcolor=#E9E9E9
| 146720 ||  || — || November 19, 2001 || Socorro || LINEAR || — || align=right | 2.6 km || 
|-id=721 bgcolor=#d6d6d6
| 146721 ||  || — || December 8, 2001 || Socorro || LINEAR || THM || align=right | 4.5 km || 
|-id=722 bgcolor=#E9E9E9
| 146722 ||  || — || December 9, 2001 || Socorro || LINEAR || — || align=right | 4.0 km || 
|-id=723 bgcolor=#E9E9E9
| 146723 ||  || — || December 9, 2001 || Socorro || LINEAR || HNS || align=right | 2.9 km || 
|-id=724 bgcolor=#E9E9E9
| 146724 ||  || — || December 10, 2001 || Socorro || LINEAR || — || align=right | 5.4 km || 
|-id=725 bgcolor=#fefefe
| 146725 ||  || — || December 11, 2001 || Socorro || LINEAR || H || align=right | 1.2 km || 
|-id=726 bgcolor=#E9E9E9
| 146726 ||  || — || December 7, 2001 || Socorro || LINEAR || AGN || align=right | 1.9 km || 
|-id=727 bgcolor=#E9E9E9
| 146727 ||  || — || December 9, 2001 || Socorro || LINEAR || EUN || align=right | 2.7 km || 
|-id=728 bgcolor=#E9E9E9
| 146728 ||  || — || December 9, 2001 || Socorro || LINEAR || CLO || align=right | 3.6 km || 
|-id=729 bgcolor=#d6d6d6
| 146729 ||  || — || December 14, 2001 || Socorro || LINEAR || — || align=right | 7.4 km || 
|-id=730 bgcolor=#d6d6d6
| 146730 ||  || — || December 9, 2001 || Socorro || LINEAR || — || align=right | 4.3 km || 
|-id=731 bgcolor=#E9E9E9
| 146731 ||  || — || December 10, 2001 || Socorro || LINEAR || AST || align=right | 3.1 km || 
|-id=732 bgcolor=#E9E9E9
| 146732 ||  || — || December 10, 2001 || Socorro || LINEAR || AST || align=right | 3.1 km || 
|-id=733 bgcolor=#d6d6d6
| 146733 ||  || — || December 10, 2001 || Socorro || LINEAR || — || align=right | 7.2 km || 
|-id=734 bgcolor=#E9E9E9
| 146734 ||  || — || December 10, 2001 || Socorro || LINEAR || AGN || align=right | 2.2 km || 
|-id=735 bgcolor=#d6d6d6
| 146735 ||  || — || December 10, 2001 || Socorro || LINEAR || — || align=right | 4.5 km || 
|-id=736 bgcolor=#d6d6d6
| 146736 ||  || — || December 11, 2001 || Socorro || LINEAR || — || align=right | 4.7 km || 
|-id=737 bgcolor=#E9E9E9
| 146737 ||  || — || December 11, 2001 || Socorro || LINEAR || — || align=right | 5.4 km || 
|-id=738 bgcolor=#d6d6d6
| 146738 ||  || — || December 11, 2001 || Socorro || LINEAR || 615 || align=right | 3.3 km || 
|-id=739 bgcolor=#d6d6d6
| 146739 ||  || — || December 11, 2001 || Socorro || LINEAR || — || align=right | 4.5 km || 
|-id=740 bgcolor=#d6d6d6
| 146740 ||  || — || December 10, 2001 || Socorro || LINEAR || EOS || align=right | 3.9 km || 
|-id=741 bgcolor=#E9E9E9
| 146741 ||  || — || December 10, 2001 || Socorro || LINEAR || AGN || align=right | 1.9 km || 
|-id=742 bgcolor=#E9E9E9
| 146742 ||  || — || December 11, 2001 || Socorro || LINEAR || GEF || align=right | 2.0 km || 
|-id=743 bgcolor=#d6d6d6
| 146743 ||  || — || December 13, 2001 || Socorro || LINEAR || — || align=right | 4.8 km || 
|-id=744 bgcolor=#d6d6d6
| 146744 ||  || — || December 13, 2001 || Socorro || LINEAR || — || align=right | 5.1 km || 
|-id=745 bgcolor=#E9E9E9
| 146745 ||  || — || December 14, 2001 || Socorro || LINEAR || DOR || align=right | 4.7 km || 
|-id=746 bgcolor=#d6d6d6
| 146746 ||  || — || December 14, 2001 || Socorro || LINEAR || KOR || align=right | 2.2 km || 
|-id=747 bgcolor=#d6d6d6
| 146747 ||  || — || December 14, 2001 || Socorro || LINEAR || — || align=right | 4.3 km || 
|-id=748 bgcolor=#E9E9E9
| 146748 ||  || — || December 14, 2001 || Socorro || LINEAR || — || align=right | 3.4 km || 
|-id=749 bgcolor=#d6d6d6
| 146749 ||  || — || December 14, 2001 || Socorro || LINEAR || — || align=right | 5.7 km || 
|-id=750 bgcolor=#E9E9E9
| 146750 ||  || — || December 14, 2001 || Socorro || LINEAR || XIZ || align=right | 2.5 km || 
|-id=751 bgcolor=#E9E9E9
| 146751 ||  || — || December 14, 2001 || Socorro || LINEAR || HEN || align=right | 1.8 km || 
|-id=752 bgcolor=#d6d6d6
| 146752 ||  || — || December 14, 2001 || Socorro || LINEAR || KOR || align=right | 2.2 km || 
|-id=753 bgcolor=#d6d6d6
| 146753 ||  || — || December 14, 2001 || Socorro || LINEAR || KOR || align=right | 2.8 km || 
|-id=754 bgcolor=#d6d6d6
| 146754 ||  || — || December 14, 2001 || Socorro || LINEAR || — || align=right | 5.0 km || 
|-id=755 bgcolor=#E9E9E9
| 146755 ||  || — || December 14, 2001 || Socorro || LINEAR || — || align=right | 2.4 km || 
|-id=756 bgcolor=#d6d6d6
| 146756 ||  || — || December 14, 2001 || Socorro || LINEAR || EMA || align=right | 6.1 km || 
|-id=757 bgcolor=#d6d6d6
| 146757 ||  || — || December 14, 2001 || Socorro || LINEAR || KOR || align=right | 2.9 km || 
|-id=758 bgcolor=#d6d6d6
| 146758 ||  || — || December 14, 2001 || Socorro || LINEAR || — || align=right | 4.7 km || 
|-id=759 bgcolor=#d6d6d6
| 146759 ||  || — || December 14, 2001 || Socorro || LINEAR || KOR || align=right | 3.0 km || 
|-id=760 bgcolor=#d6d6d6
| 146760 ||  || — || December 14, 2001 || Socorro || LINEAR || THM || align=right | 4.1 km || 
|-id=761 bgcolor=#d6d6d6
| 146761 ||  || — || December 14, 2001 || Socorro || LINEAR || — || align=right | 4.3 km || 
|-id=762 bgcolor=#d6d6d6
| 146762 ||  || — || December 14, 2001 || Socorro || LINEAR || EOS || align=right | 3.9 km || 
|-id=763 bgcolor=#d6d6d6
| 146763 ||  || — || December 14, 2001 || Socorro || LINEAR || — || align=right | 4.9 km || 
|-id=764 bgcolor=#d6d6d6
| 146764 ||  || — || December 14, 2001 || Socorro || LINEAR || — || align=right | 5.4 km || 
|-id=765 bgcolor=#d6d6d6
| 146765 ||  || — || December 14, 2001 || Socorro || LINEAR || — || align=right | 5.5 km || 
|-id=766 bgcolor=#E9E9E9
| 146766 ||  || — || December 14, 2001 || Kitt Peak || Spacewatch || HEN || align=right | 1.4 km || 
|-id=767 bgcolor=#E9E9E9
| 146767 ||  || — || December 5, 2001 || Haleakala || NEAT || GAL || align=right | 2.8 km || 
|-id=768 bgcolor=#E9E9E9
| 146768 ||  || — || December 11, 2001 || Socorro || LINEAR || AGN || align=right | 2.3 km || 
|-id=769 bgcolor=#d6d6d6
| 146769 ||  || — || December 14, 2001 || Socorro || LINEAR || — || align=right | 5.2 km || 
|-id=770 bgcolor=#E9E9E9
| 146770 ||  || — || December 14, 2001 || Socorro || LINEAR || — || align=right | 4.2 km || 
|-id=771 bgcolor=#d6d6d6
| 146771 ||  || — || December 15, 2001 || Socorro || LINEAR || — || align=right | 4.2 km || 
|-id=772 bgcolor=#E9E9E9
| 146772 ||  || — || December 15, 2001 || Socorro || LINEAR || — || align=right | 3.5 km || 
|-id=773 bgcolor=#E9E9E9
| 146773 ||  || — || December 15, 2001 || Socorro || LINEAR || NEM || align=right | 4.4 km || 
|-id=774 bgcolor=#E9E9E9
| 146774 ||  || — || December 15, 2001 || Socorro || LINEAR || — || align=right | 3.2 km || 
|-id=775 bgcolor=#E9E9E9
| 146775 ||  || — || December 15, 2001 || Socorro || LINEAR || HOF || align=right | 4.0 km || 
|-id=776 bgcolor=#E9E9E9
| 146776 ||  || — || December 15, 2001 || Socorro || LINEAR || — || align=right | 3.4 km || 
|-id=777 bgcolor=#d6d6d6
| 146777 ||  || — || December 15, 2001 || Socorro || LINEAR || — || align=right | 4.6 km || 
|-id=778 bgcolor=#E9E9E9
| 146778 ||  || — || December 15, 2001 || Socorro || LINEAR || — || align=right | 4.3 km || 
|-id=779 bgcolor=#E9E9E9
| 146779 ||  || — || December 15, 2001 || Socorro || LINEAR || GEF || align=right | 2.5 km || 
|-id=780 bgcolor=#d6d6d6
| 146780 ||  || — || December 15, 2001 || Socorro || LINEAR || — || align=right | 3.9 km || 
|-id=781 bgcolor=#d6d6d6
| 146781 ||  || — || December 15, 2001 || Socorro || LINEAR || — || align=right | 3.7 km || 
|-id=782 bgcolor=#E9E9E9
| 146782 ||  || — || December 14, 2001 || Socorro || LINEAR || — || align=right | 3.4 km || 
|-id=783 bgcolor=#d6d6d6
| 146783 ||  || — || December 14, 2001 || Socorro || LINEAR || KAR || align=right | 1.9 km || 
|-id=784 bgcolor=#E9E9E9
| 146784 ||  || — || December 15, 2001 || Socorro || LINEAR || — || align=right | 4.0 km || 
|-id=785 bgcolor=#d6d6d6
| 146785 ||  || — || December 14, 2001 || Socorro || LINEAR || LIX || align=right | 7.7 km || 
|-id=786 bgcolor=#d6d6d6
| 146786 ||  || — || December 9, 2001 || Socorro || LINEAR || — || align=right | 5.7 km || 
|-id=787 bgcolor=#E9E9E9
| 146787 ||  || — || December 17, 2001 || Socorro || LINEAR || — || align=right | 3.9 km || 
|-id=788 bgcolor=#d6d6d6
| 146788 ||  || — || December 17, 2001 || Socorro || LINEAR || — || align=right | 4.7 km || 
|-id=789 bgcolor=#d6d6d6
| 146789 ||  || — || December 17, 2001 || Socorro || LINEAR || — || align=right | 3.6 km || 
|-id=790 bgcolor=#d6d6d6
| 146790 ||  || — || December 18, 2001 || Socorro || LINEAR || — || align=right | 4.3 km || 
|-id=791 bgcolor=#E9E9E9
| 146791 ||  || — || December 18, 2001 || Socorro || LINEAR || WIT || align=right | 1.7 km || 
|-id=792 bgcolor=#E9E9E9
| 146792 ||  || — || December 18, 2001 || Socorro || LINEAR || — || align=right | 3.7 km || 
|-id=793 bgcolor=#d6d6d6
| 146793 ||  || — || December 18, 2001 || Socorro || LINEAR || BRA || align=right | 3.2 km || 
|-id=794 bgcolor=#E9E9E9
| 146794 ||  || — || December 18, 2001 || Socorro || LINEAR || — || align=right | 4.0 km || 
|-id=795 bgcolor=#d6d6d6
| 146795 ||  || — || December 18, 2001 || Socorro || LINEAR || — || align=right | 5.5 km || 
|-id=796 bgcolor=#E9E9E9
| 146796 ||  || — || December 18, 2001 || Socorro || LINEAR || — || align=right | 3.6 km || 
|-id=797 bgcolor=#d6d6d6
| 146797 ||  || — || December 18, 2001 || Socorro || LINEAR || THM || align=right | 3.0 km || 
|-id=798 bgcolor=#E9E9E9
| 146798 ||  || — || December 18, 2001 || Socorro || LINEAR || HOF || align=right | 4.7 km || 
|-id=799 bgcolor=#E9E9E9
| 146799 ||  || — || December 18, 2001 || Socorro || LINEAR || NEM || align=right | 3.7 km || 
|-id=800 bgcolor=#d6d6d6
| 146800 ||  || — || December 18, 2001 || Socorro || LINEAR || BRA || align=right | 2.5 km || 
|}

146801–146900 

|-bgcolor=#d6d6d6
| 146801 ||  || — || December 18, 2001 || Socorro || LINEAR || — || align=right | 4.4 km || 
|-id=802 bgcolor=#E9E9E9
| 146802 ||  || — || December 18, 2001 || Socorro || LINEAR || AGN || align=right | 2.4 km || 
|-id=803 bgcolor=#d6d6d6
| 146803 ||  || — || December 18, 2001 || Socorro || LINEAR || KOR || align=right | 2.6 km || 
|-id=804 bgcolor=#E9E9E9
| 146804 ||  || — || December 18, 2001 || Socorro || LINEAR || — || align=right | 3.4 km || 
|-id=805 bgcolor=#d6d6d6
| 146805 ||  || — || December 18, 2001 || Socorro || LINEAR || — || align=right | 5.9 km || 
|-id=806 bgcolor=#d6d6d6
| 146806 ||  || — || December 18, 2001 || Socorro || LINEAR || KOR || align=right | 2.2 km || 
|-id=807 bgcolor=#d6d6d6
| 146807 ||  || — || December 18, 2001 || Socorro || LINEAR || EOS || align=right | 3.5 km || 
|-id=808 bgcolor=#d6d6d6
| 146808 ||  || — || December 18, 2001 || Socorro || LINEAR || EOS || align=right | 3.6 km || 
|-id=809 bgcolor=#E9E9E9
| 146809 ||  || — || December 18, 2001 || Socorro || LINEAR || XIZ || align=right | 2.4 km || 
|-id=810 bgcolor=#d6d6d6
| 146810 ||  || — || December 18, 2001 || Socorro || LINEAR || — || align=right | 4.7 km || 
|-id=811 bgcolor=#d6d6d6
| 146811 ||  || — || December 18, 2001 || Socorro || LINEAR || HYG || align=right | 7.4 km || 
|-id=812 bgcolor=#d6d6d6
| 146812 ||  || — || December 17, 2001 || Kitt Peak || Spacewatch || KOR || align=right | 2.3 km || 
|-id=813 bgcolor=#d6d6d6
| 146813 ||  || — || December 18, 2001 || Kitt Peak || Spacewatch || EOS || align=right | 3.7 km || 
|-id=814 bgcolor=#d6d6d6
| 146814 ||  || — || December 18, 2001 || Palomar || NEAT || — || align=right | 5.3 km || 
|-id=815 bgcolor=#E9E9E9
| 146815 ||  || — || December 17, 2001 || Socorro || LINEAR || — || align=right | 4.0 km || 
|-id=816 bgcolor=#E9E9E9
| 146816 ||  || — || December 17, 2001 || Socorro || LINEAR || — || align=right | 3.5 km || 
|-id=817 bgcolor=#d6d6d6
| 146817 ||  || — || December 18, 2001 || Socorro || LINEAR || — || align=right | 6.1 km || 
|-id=818 bgcolor=#d6d6d6
| 146818 ||  || — || December 17, 2001 || Socorro || LINEAR || — || align=right | 6.1 km || 
|-id=819 bgcolor=#d6d6d6
| 146819 ||  || — || December 18, 2001 || Socorro || LINEAR || — || align=right | 6.5 km || 
|-id=820 bgcolor=#d6d6d6
| 146820 ||  || — || December 17, 2001 || Socorro || LINEAR || — || align=right | 5.4 km || 
|-id=821 bgcolor=#d6d6d6
| 146821 ||  || — || December 17, 2001 || Socorro || LINEAR || EOS || align=right | 3.3 km || 
|-id=822 bgcolor=#d6d6d6
| 146822 ||  || — || December 17, 2001 || Socorro || LINEAR || URS || align=right | 5.7 km || 
|-id=823 bgcolor=#E9E9E9
| 146823 ||  || — || December 22, 2001 || Socorro || LINEAR || — || align=right | 2.8 km || 
|-id=824 bgcolor=#E9E9E9
| 146824 ||  || — || December 22, 2001 || Socorro || LINEAR || MAR || align=right | 4.0 km || 
|-id=825 bgcolor=#d6d6d6
| 146825 ||  || — || December 17, 2001 || Socorro || LINEAR || — || align=right | 4.4 km || 
|-id=826 bgcolor=#d6d6d6
| 146826 ||  || — || December 17, 2001 || Socorro || LINEAR || — || align=right | 5.3 km || 
|-id=827 bgcolor=#E9E9E9
| 146827 ||  || — || December 18, 2001 || Anderson Mesa || LONEOS || ADE || align=right | 4.7 km || 
|-id=828 bgcolor=#d6d6d6
| 146828 ||  || — || December 20, 2001 || Palomar || NEAT || — || align=right | 6.8 km || 
|-id=829 bgcolor=#d6d6d6
| 146829 ||  || — || January 9, 2002 || Cima Ekar || ADAS || — || align=right | 6.7 km || 
|-id=830 bgcolor=#d6d6d6
| 146830 ||  || — || January 7, 2002 || Kitt Peak || Spacewatch || KOR || align=right | 1.9 km || 
|-id=831 bgcolor=#fefefe
| 146831 ||  || — || January 11, 2002 || Socorro || LINEAR || H || align=right | 1.3 km || 
|-id=832 bgcolor=#d6d6d6
| 146832 ||  || — || January 7, 2002 || Palomar || NEAT || BRA || align=right | 2.6 km || 
|-id=833 bgcolor=#fefefe
| 146833 ||  || — || January 6, 2002 || Haleakala || NEAT || H || align=right | 1.2 km || 
|-id=834 bgcolor=#E9E9E9
| 146834 ||  || — || January 4, 2002 || Bergisch Gladbach || W. Bickel || — || align=right | 2.6 km || 
|-id=835 bgcolor=#d6d6d6
| 146835 ||  || — || January 9, 2002 || Socorro || LINEAR || — || align=right | 4.1 km || 
|-id=836 bgcolor=#E9E9E9
| 146836 ||  || — || January 9, 2002 || Socorro || LINEAR || — || align=right | 3.7 km || 
|-id=837 bgcolor=#d6d6d6
| 146837 ||  || — || January 9, 2002 || Socorro || LINEAR || — || align=right | 7.0 km || 
|-id=838 bgcolor=#d6d6d6
| 146838 ||  || — || January 9, 2002 || Socorro || LINEAR || — || align=right | 3.5 km || 
|-id=839 bgcolor=#d6d6d6
| 146839 ||  || — || January 9, 2002 || Socorro || LINEAR || — || align=right | 6.9 km || 
|-id=840 bgcolor=#d6d6d6
| 146840 ||  || — || January 9, 2002 || Socorro || LINEAR || — || align=right | 3.3 km || 
|-id=841 bgcolor=#d6d6d6
| 146841 ||  || — || January 9, 2002 || Socorro || LINEAR || — || align=right | 5.4 km || 
|-id=842 bgcolor=#d6d6d6
| 146842 ||  || — || January 9, 2002 || Socorro || LINEAR || — || align=right | 2.9 km || 
|-id=843 bgcolor=#d6d6d6
| 146843 ||  || — || January 12, 2002 || Kitt Peak || Spacewatch || KOR || align=right | 2.1 km || 
|-id=844 bgcolor=#d6d6d6
| 146844 ||  || — || January 8, 2002 || Socorro || LINEAR || — || align=right | 3.4 km || 
|-id=845 bgcolor=#E9E9E9
| 146845 ||  || — || January 9, 2002 || Socorro || LINEAR || — || align=right | 2.8 km || 
|-id=846 bgcolor=#d6d6d6
| 146846 ||  || — || January 9, 2002 || Socorro || LINEAR || TEL || align=right | 2.5 km || 
|-id=847 bgcolor=#d6d6d6
| 146847 ||  || — || January 9, 2002 || Socorro || LINEAR || — || align=right | 6.4 km || 
|-id=848 bgcolor=#d6d6d6
| 146848 ||  || — || January 9, 2002 || Socorro || LINEAR || — || align=right | 4.9 km || 
|-id=849 bgcolor=#d6d6d6
| 146849 ||  || — || January 8, 2002 || Socorro || LINEAR || TEL || align=right | 3.4 km || 
|-id=850 bgcolor=#d6d6d6
| 146850 ||  || — || January 8, 2002 || Socorro || LINEAR || — || align=right | 5.7 km || 
|-id=851 bgcolor=#d6d6d6
| 146851 ||  || — || January 9, 2002 || Socorro || LINEAR || KOR || align=right | 2.0 km || 
|-id=852 bgcolor=#d6d6d6
| 146852 ||  || — || January 9, 2002 || Socorro || LINEAR || — || align=right | 4.7 km || 
|-id=853 bgcolor=#d6d6d6
| 146853 ||  || — || January 9, 2002 || Socorro || LINEAR || — || align=right | 4.4 km || 
|-id=854 bgcolor=#d6d6d6
| 146854 ||  || — || January 9, 2002 || Socorro || LINEAR || — || align=right | 5.4 km || 
|-id=855 bgcolor=#d6d6d6
| 146855 ||  || — || January 9, 2002 || Socorro || LINEAR || — || align=right | 4.5 km || 
|-id=856 bgcolor=#d6d6d6
| 146856 ||  || — || January 9, 2002 || Socorro || LINEAR || — || align=right | 5.5 km || 
|-id=857 bgcolor=#d6d6d6
| 146857 ||  || — || January 13, 2002 || Socorro || LINEAR || — || align=right | 3.5 km || 
|-id=858 bgcolor=#d6d6d6
| 146858 ||  || — || January 13, 2002 || Palomar || NEAT || — || align=right | 4.7 km || 
|-id=859 bgcolor=#E9E9E9
| 146859 ||  || — || January 13, 2002 || Socorro || LINEAR || — || align=right | 5.8 km || 
|-id=860 bgcolor=#d6d6d6
| 146860 ||  || — || January 14, 2002 || Socorro || LINEAR || EOS || align=right | 2.7 km || 
|-id=861 bgcolor=#d6d6d6
| 146861 ||  || — || January 14, 2002 || Socorro || LINEAR || — || align=right | 4.8 km || 
|-id=862 bgcolor=#d6d6d6
| 146862 ||  || — || January 14, 2002 || Socorro || LINEAR || — || align=right | 6.8 km || 
|-id=863 bgcolor=#d6d6d6
| 146863 ||  || — || January 13, 2002 || Socorro || LINEAR || EOS || align=right | 3.1 km || 
|-id=864 bgcolor=#d6d6d6
| 146864 ||  || — || January 13, 2002 || Socorro || LINEAR || — || align=right | 5.3 km || 
|-id=865 bgcolor=#d6d6d6
| 146865 ||  || — || January 14, 2002 || Socorro || LINEAR || THM || align=right | 3.6 km || 
|-id=866 bgcolor=#d6d6d6
| 146866 ||  || — || January 14, 2002 || Socorro || LINEAR || HYG || align=right | 4.2 km || 
|-id=867 bgcolor=#d6d6d6
| 146867 ||  || — || January 14, 2002 || Socorro || LINEAR || — || align=right | 6.3 km || 
|-id=868 bgcolor=#d6d6d6
| 146868 ||  || — || January 14, 2002 || Socorro || LINEAR || — || align=right | 4.7 km || 
|-id=869 bgcolor=#d6d6d6
| 146869 ||  || — || January 5, 2002 || Palomar || NEAT || ITH || align=right | 2.5 km || 
|-id=870 bgcolor=#E9E9E9
| 146870 ||  || — || January 5, 2002 || Palomar || NEAT || — || align=right | 5.4 km || 
|-id=871 bgcolor=#d6d6d6
| 146871 ||  || — || January 5, 2002 || Anderson Mesa || LONEOS || EOS || align=right | 3.3 km || 
|-id=872 bgcolor=#d6d6d6
| 146872 ||  || — || January 11, 2002 || Palomar || NEAT || TIR || align=right | 5.2 km || 
|-id=873 bgcolor=#d6d6d6
| 146873 ||  || — || January 8, 2002 || Socorro || LINEAR || VER || align=right | 5.3 km || 
|-id=874 bgcolor=#d6d6d6
| 146874 || 2002 BB || — || January 17, 2002 || Oaxaca || J. M. Roe || — || align=right | 5.3 km || 
|-id=875 bgcolor=#E9E9E9
| 146875 ||  || — || January 21, 2002 || Socorro || LINEAR || — || align=right | 4.2 km || 
|-id=876 bgcolor=#fefefe
| 146876 ||  || — || January 25, 2002 || Socorro || LINEAR || H || align=right | 1.1 km || 
|-id=877 bgcolor=#d6d6d6
| 146877 ||  || — || January 25, 2002 || Palomar || NEAT || HYG || align=right | 5.3 km || 
|-id=878 bgcolor=#d6d6d6
| 146878 ||  || — || February 2, 2002 || Pla D'Arguines || R. Ferrando || — || align=right | 4.6 km || 
|-id=879 bgcolor=#d6d6d6
| 146879 ||  || — || February 5, 2002 || Palomar || NEAT || HYG || align=right | 4.3 km || 
|-id=880 bgcolor=#d6d6d6
| 146880 ||  || — || February 5, 2002 || Palomar || NEAT || — || align=right | 4.8 km || 
|-id=881 bgcolor=#E9E9E9
| 146881 ||  || — || February 1, 2002 || Anderson Mesa || LONEOS || — || align=right | 5.8 km || 
|-id=882 bgcolor=#d6d6d6
| 146882 ||  || — || February 5, 2002 || Palomar || NEAT || — || align=right | 4.3 km || 
|-id=883 bgcolor=#d6d6d6
| 146883 ||  || — || February 6, 2002 || Haleakala || NEAT || NAE || align=right | 5.0 km || 
|-id=884 bgcolor=#d6d6d6
| 146884 ||  || — || February 6, 2002 || Haleakala || NEAT || — || align=right | 8.1 km || 
|-id=885 bgcolor=#d6d6d6
| 146885 ||  || — || February 6, 2002 || Socorro || LINEAR || — || align=right | 5.0 km || 
|-id=886 bgcolor=#d6d6d6
| 146886 ||  || — || February 6, 2002 || Socorro || LINEAR || — || align=right | 4.5 km || 
|-id=887 bgcolor=#d6d6d6
| 146887 ||  || — || February 6, 2002 || Socorro || LINEAR || VER || align=right | 6.8 km || 
|-id=888 bgcolor=#d6d6d6
| 146888 ||  || — || February 6, 2002 || Socorro || LINEAR || — || align=right | 5.4 km || 
|-id=889 bgcolor=#d6d6d6
| 146889 ||  || — || February 7, 2002 || Socorro || LINEAR || THM || align=right | 3.4 km || 
|-id=890 bgcolor=#d6d6d6
| 146890 ||  || — || February 7, 2002 || Socorro || LINEAR || HYG || align=right | 5.0 km || 
|-id=891 bgcolor=#d6d6d6
| 146891 ||  || — || February 7, 2002 || Palomar || NEAT || — || align=right | 5.6 km || 
|-id=892 bgcolor=#d6d6d6
| 146892 ||  || — || February 3, 2002 || Haleakala || NEAT || EOS || align=right | 3.7 km || 
|-id=893 bgcolor=#d6d6d6
| 146893 ||  || — || February 7, 2002 || Socorro || LINEAR || — || align=right | 5.2 km || 
|-id=894 bgcolor=#fefefe
| 146894 ||  || — || February 14, 2002 || Socorro || LINEAR || H || align=right | 1.2 km || 
|-id=895 bgcolor=#d6d6d6
| 146895 ||  || — || February 7, 2002 || Socorro || LINEAR || KOR || align=right | 2.5 km || 
|-id=896 bgcolor=#d6d6d6
| 146896 ||  || — || February 7, 2002 || Socorro || LINEAR || — || align=right | 3.9 km || 
|-id=897 bgcolor=#d6d6d6
| 146897 ||  || — || February 7, 2002 || Socorro || LINEAR || HYG || align=right | 4.4 km || 
|-id=898 bgcolor=#d6d6d6
| 146898 ||  || — || February 7, 2002 || Socorro || LINEAR || — || align=right | 4.4 km || 
|-id=899 bgcolor=#d6d6d6
| 146899 ||  || — || February 7, 2002 || Socorro || LINEAR || — || align=right | 3.6 km || 
|-id=900 bgcolor=#d6d6d6
| 146900 ||  || — || February 7, 2002 || Socorro || LINEAR || VER || align=right | 5.6 km || 
|}

146901–147000 

|-bgcolor=#d6d6d6
| 146901 ||  || — || February 7, 2002 || Socorro || LINEAR || THM || align=right | 4.0 km || 
|-id=902 bgcolor=#d6d6d6
| 146902 ||  || — || February 7, 2002 || Socorro || LINEAR || THM || align=right | 4.0 km || 
|-id=903 bgcolor=#d6d6d6
| 146903 ||  || — || February 7, 2002 || Socorro || LINEAR || — || align=right | 6.9 km || 
|-id=904 bgcolor=#d6d6d6
| 146904 ||  || — || February 7, 2002 || Socorro || LINEAR || — || align=right | 5.4 km || 
|-id=905 bgcolor=#d6d6d6
| 146905 ||  || — || February 7, 2002 || Socorro || LINEAR || HYG || align=right | 4.2 km || 
|-id=906 bgcolor=#d6d6d6
| 146906 ||  || — || February 7, 2002 || Socorro || LINEAR || THM || align=right | 5.1 km || 
|-id=907 bgcolor=#d6d6d6
| 146907 ||  || — || February 7, 2002 || Socorro || LINEAR || — || align=right | 5.3 km || 
|-id=908 bgcolor=#d6d6d6
| 146908 ||  || — || February 10, 2002 || Socorro || LINEAR || — || align=right | 6.4 km || 
|-id=909 bgcolor=#d6d6d6
| 146909 ||  || — || February 10, 2002 || Socorro || LINEAR || — || align=right | 5.7 km || 
|-id=910 bgcolor=#d6d6d6
| 146910 ||  || — || February 7, 2002 || Socorro || LINEAR || EOS || align=right | 3.6 km || 
|-id=911 bgcolor=#d6d6d6
| 146911 ||  || — || February 8, 2002 || Socorro || LINEAR || — || align=right | 5.2 km || 
|-id=912 bgcolor=#d6d6d6
| 146912 ||  || — || February 10, 2002 || Socorro || LINEAR || — || align=right | 3.5 km || 
|-id=913 bgcolor=#d6d6d6
| 146913 ||  || — || February 10, 2002 || Socorro || LINEAR || THM || align=right | 3.1 km || 
|-id=914 bgcolor=#d6d6d6
| 146914 ||  || — || February 10, 2002 || Socorro || LINEAR || — || align=right | 4.4 km || 
|-id=915 bgcolor=#d6d6d6
| 146915 ||  || — || February 10, 2002 || Socorro || LINEAR || — || align=right | 4.8 km || 
|-id=916 bgcolor=#d6d6d6
| 146916 ||  || — || February 10, 2002 || Socorro || LINEAR || THM || align=right | 3.6 km || 
|-id=917 bgcolor=#d6d6d6
| 146917 ||  || — || February 10, 2002 || Socorro || LINEAR || — || align=right | 4.2 km || 
|-id=918 bgcolor=#d6d6d6
| 146918 ||  || — || February 7, 2002 || Palomar || NEAT || URSslow || align=right | 6.7 km || 
|-id=919 bgcolor=#d6d6d6
| 146919 ||  || — || February 3, 2002 || Haleakala || NEAT || EOS || align=right | 3.9 km || 
|-id=920 bgcolor=#d6d6d6
| 146920 ||  || — || February 6, 2002 || Palomar || NEAT || HYG || align=right | 4.0 km || 
|-id=921 bgcolor=#d6d6d6
| 146921 Michaelbuckley ||  ||  || February 6, 2002 || Kitt Peak || M. W. Buie || THM || align=right | 3.3 km || 
|-id=922 bgcolor=#d6d6d6
| 146922 ||  || — || February 6, 2002 || Palomar || NEAT || — || align=right | 4.8 km || 
|-id=923 bgcolor=#d6d6d6
| 146923 ||  || — || February 7, 2002 || Palomar || NEAT || — || align=right | 3.4 km || 
|-id=924 bgcolor=#d6d6d6
| 146924 ||  || — || February 7, 2002 || Palomar || NEAT || KOR || align=right | 2.4 km || 
|-id=925 bgcolor=#d6d6d6
| 146925 ||  || — || February 6, 2002 || Anderson Mesa || LONEOS || — || align=right | 5.5 km || 
|-id=926 bgcolor=#d6d6d6
| 146926 ||  || — || February 8, 2002 || Anderson Mesa || LONEOS || — || align=right | 5.6 km || 
|-id=927 bgcolor=#d6d6d6
| 146927 ||  || — || February 7, 2002 || Palomar || NEAT || — || align=right | 4.0 km || 
|-id=928 bgcolor=#d6d6d6
| 146928 ||  || — || February 10, 2002 || Socorro || LINEAR || — || align=right | 5.2 km || 
|-id=929 bgcolor=#d6d6d6
| 146929 ||  || — || February 11, 2002 || Socorro || LINEAR || — || align=right | 3.3 km || 
|-id=930 bgcolor=#d6d6d6
| 146930 ||  || — || February 11, 2002 || Socorro || LINEAR || — || align=right | 4.0 km || 
|-id=931 bgcolor=#d6d6d6
| 146931 ||  || — || February 8, 2002 || Socorro || LINEAR || — || align=right | 5.4 km || 
|-id=932 bgcolor=#d6d6d6
| 146932 ||  || — || February 10, 2002 || Socorro || LINEAR || — || align=right | 3.8 km || 
|-id=933 bgcolor=#d6d6d6
| 146933 ||  || — || February 6, 2002 || Palomar || NEAT || HYG || align=right | 4.3 km || 
|-id=934 bgcolor=#d6d6d6
| 146934 ||  || — || February 10, 2002 || Socorro || LINEAR || THM || align=right | 3.0 km || 
|-id=935 bgcolor=#d6d6d6
| 146935 ||  || — || February 22, 2002 || Socorro || LINEAR || ALA || align=right | 7.7 km || 
|-id=936 bgcolor=#d6d6d6
| 146936 ||  || — || February 17, 2002 || Palomar || NEAT || — || align=right | 7.9 km || 
|-id=937 bgcolor=#d6d6d6
| 146937 ||  || — || February 19, 2002 || Socorro || LINEAR || — || align=right | 8.8 km || 
|-id=938 bgcolor=#d6d6d6
| 146938 ||  || — || February 24, 2002 || Palomar || NEAT || — || align=right | 4.5 km || 
|-id=939 bgcolor=#fefefe
| 146939 ||  || — || February 19, 2002 || Desert Eagle || W. K. Y. Yeung || H || align=right | 1.4 km || 
|-id=940 bgcolor=#d6d6d6
| 146940 ||  || — || March 10, 2002 || Cima Ekar || ADAS || — || align=right | 3.9 km || 
|-id=941 bgcolor=#d6d6d6
| 146941 ||  || — || March 10, 2002 || Cima Ekar || ADAS || — || align=right | 3.8 km || 
|-id=942 bgcolor=#FA8072
| 146942 ||  || — || March 9, 2002 || Socorro || LINEAR || H || align=right | 1.2 km || 
|-id=943 bgcolor=#d6d6d6
| 146943 ||  || — || March 6, 2002 || Palomar || NEAT || EOS || align=right | 5.7 km || 
|-id=944 bgcolor=#d6d6d6
| 146944 ||  || — || March 5, 2002 || Anderson Mesa || LONEOS || — || align=right | 9.3 km || 
|-id=945 bgcolor=#d6d6d6
| 146945 ||  || — || March 5, 2002 || Kitt Peak || Spacewatch || — || align=right | 4.1 km || 
|-id=946 bgcolor=#fefefe
| 146946 ||  || — || March 10, 2002 || Haleakala || NEAT || H || align=right | 1.0 km || 
|-id=947 bgcolor=#d6d6d6
| 146947 ||  || — || March 9, 2002 || Socorro || LINEAR || THM || align=right | 3.7 km || 
|-id=948 bgcolor=#d6d6d6
| 146948 ||  || — || March 12, 2002 || Socorro || LINEAR || THM || align=right | 4.8 km || 
|-id=949 bgcolor=#d6d6d6
| 146949 ||  || — || March 12, 2002 || Kitt Peak || Spacewatch || — || align=right | 4.4 km || 
|-id=950 bgcolor=#d6d6d6
| 146950 ||  || — || March 13, 2002 || Socorro || LINEAR || KOR || align=right | 3.0 km || 
|-id=951 bgcolor=#d6d6d6
| 146951 ||  || — || March 13, 2002 || Socorro || LINEAR || 7:4 || align=right | 4.4 km || 
|-id=952 bgcolor=#d6d6d6
| 146952 ||  || — || March 13, 2002 || Socorro || LINEAR || CHA || align=right | 4.1 km || 
|-id=953 bgcolor=#d6d6d6
| 146953 ||  || — || March 12, 2002 || Palomar || NEAT || THM || align=right | 3.7 km || 
|-id=954 bgcolor=#d6d6d6
| 146954 ||  || — || March 12, 2002 || Socorro || LINEAR || THM || align=right | 5.6 km || 
|-id=955 bgcolor=#d6d6d6
| 146955 ||  || — || March 12, 2002 || Palomar || NEAT || — || align=right | 4.6 km || 
|-id=956 bgcolor=#d6d6d6
| 146956 ||  || — || March 9, 2002 || Palomar || NEAT || — || align=right | 5.2 km || 
|-id=957 bgcolor=#d6d6d6
| 146957 ||  || — || March 19, 2002 || Palomar || NEAT || — || align=right | 7.5 km || 
|-id=958 bgcolor=#d6d6d6
| 146958 ||  || — || March 31, 2002 || Palomar || NEAT || — || align=right | 6.4 km || 
|-id=959 bgcolor=#d6d6d6
| 146959 ||  || — || March 18, 2002 || Socorro || LINEAR || MEL || align=right | 7.8 km || 
|-id=960 bgcolor=#d6d6d6
| 146960 ||  || — || April 2, 2002 || Palomar || NEAT || — || align=right | 4.1 km || 
|-id=961 bgcolor=#d6d6d6
| 146961 ||  || — || April 12, 2002 || Socorro || LINEAR || SHU3:2 || align=right | 9.0 km || 
|-id=962 bgcolor=#d6d6d6
| 146962 ||  || — || May 5, 2002 || Palomar || NEAT || 7:4 || align=right | 9.6 km || 
|-id=963 bgcolor=#fefefe
| 146963 ||  || — || May 3, 2002 || Desert Eagle || W. K. Y. Yeung || FLO || align=right | 1.6 km || 
|-id=964 bgcolor=#fefefe
| 146964 ||  || — || May 10, 2002 || Socorro || LINEAR || — || align=right | 3.1 km || 
|-id=965 bgcolor=#fefefe
| 146965 ||  || — || May 4, 2002 || Palomar || NEAT || H || align=right | 1.2 km || 
|-id=966 bgcolor=#fefefe
| 146966 ||  || — || May 17, 2002 || Socorro || LINEAR || H || align=right | 1.1 km || 
|-id=967 bgcolor=#fefefe
| 146967 ||  || — || June 6, 2002 || Socorro || LINEAR || — || align=right | 1.4 km || 
|-id=968 bgcolor=#fefefe
| 146968 ||  || — || June 9, 2002 || Desert Eagle || W. K. Y. Yeung || — || align=right | 1.6 km || 
|-id=969 bgcolor=#fefefe
| 146969 ||  || — || June 6, 2002 || Socorro || LINEAR || — || align=right | 1.6 km || 
|-id=970 bgcolor=#fefefe
| 146970 ||  || — || June 12, 2002 || Socorro || LINEAR || — || align=right | 1.4 km || 
|-id=971 bgcolor=#fefefe
| 146971 ||  || — || July 4, 2002 || Palomar || NEAT || — || align=right | 1.2 km || 
|-id=972 bgcolor=#fefefe
| 146972 ||  || — || July 9, 2002 || Socorro || LINEAR || — || align=right | 1.5 km || 
|-id=973 bgcolor=#fefefe
| 146973 ||  || — || July 9, 2002 || Socorro || LINEAR || V || align=right | 1.1 km || 
|-id=974 bgcolor=#fefefe
| 146974 ||  || — || July 9, 2002 || Socorro || LINEAR || FLO || align=right | 1.1 km || 
|-id=975 bgcolor=#fefefe
| 146975 ||  || — || July 9, 2002 || Socorro || LINEAR || FLOslow? || align=right | 1.2 km || 
|-id=976 bgcolor=#fefefe
| 146976 ||  || — || July 9, 2002 || Socorro || LINEAR || ERI || align=right | 3.0 km || 
|-id=977 bgcolor=#fefefe
| 146977 ||  || — || July 15, 2002 || Socorro || LINEAR || — || align=right | 1.4 km || 
|-id=978 bgcolor=#fefefe
| 146978 ||  || — || July 12, 2002 || Palomar || NEAT || — || align=right | 1.2 km || 
|-id=979 bgcolor=#fefefe
| 146979 ||  || — || July 14, 2002 || Palomar || NEAT || PHO || align=right | 4.3 km || 
|-id=980 bgcolor=#fefefe
| 146980 ||  || — || July 13, 2002 || Haleakala || NEAT || FLO || align=right | 1.3 km || 
|-id=981 bgcolor=#fefefe
| 146981 ||  || — || July 13, 2002 || Haleakala || NEAT || — || align=right | 1.2 km || 
|-id=982 bgcolor=#fefefe
| 146982 ||  || — || July 12, 2002 || Palomar || NEAT || NYS || align=right data-sort-value="0.95" | 950 m || 
|-id=983 bgcolor=#fefefe
| 146983 ||  || — || July 5, 2002 || Palomar || NEAT || MAS || align=right | 1.0 km || 
|-id=984 bgcolor=#fefefe
| 146984 ||  || — || July 22, 2002 || Palomar || NEAT || — || align=right | 1.1 km || 
|-id=985 bgcolor=#fefefe
| 146985 ||  || — || August 5, 2002 || Campo Imperatore || CINEOS || — || align=right | 1.4 km || 
|-id=986 bgcolor=#fefefe
| 146986 ||  || — || August 6, 2002 || Palomar || NEAT || NYS || align=right data-sort-value="0.84" | 840 m || 
|-id=987 bgcolor=#fefefe
| 146987 ||  || — || August 6, 2002 || Palomar || NEAT || MAS || align=right data-sort-value="0.99" | 990 m || 
|-id=988 bgcolor=#fefefe
| 146988 ||  || — || August 5, 2002 || Socorro || LINEAR || ERI || align=right | 2.8 km || 
|-id=989 bgcolor=#fefefe
| 146989 ||  || — || August 5, 2002 || Socorro || LINEAR || ERI || align=right | 3.6 km || 
|-id=990 bgcolor=#fefefe
| 146990 ||  || — || August 5, 2002 || Socorro || LINEAR || — || align=right | 1.4 km || 
|-id=991 bgcolor=#fefefe
| 146991 ||  || — || August 5, 2002 || Socorro || LINEAR || — || align=right | 2.1 km || 
|-id=992 bgcolor=#fefefe
| 146992 ||  || — || August 10, 2002 || Socorro || LINEAR || V || align=right | 1.2 km || 
|-id=993 bgcolor=#fefefe
| 146993 ||  || — || August 8, 2002 || Palomar || NEAT || FLO || align=right data-sort-value="0.92" | 920 m || 
|-id=994 bgcolor=#fefefe
| 146994 ||  || — || August 12, 2002 || Reedy Creek || J. Broughton || — || align=right | 1.7 km || 
|-id=995 bgcolor=#fefefe
| 146995 ||  || — || August 9, 2002 || Socorro || LINEAR || — || align=right | 1.3 km || 
|-id=996 bgcolor=#fefefe
| 146996 ||  || — || August 10, 2002 || Socorro || LINEAR || — || align=right | 1.3 km || 
|-id=997 bgcolor=#fefefe
| 146997 ||  || — || August 14, 2002 || Socorro || LINEAR || FLO || align=right | 1.0 km || 
|-id=998 bgcolor=#fefefe
| 146998 ||  || — || August 11, 2002 || Haleakala || NEAT || NYS || align=right data-sort-value="0.91" | 910 m || 
|-id=999 bgcolor=#fefefe
| 146999 ||  || — || August 14, 2002 || Socorro || LINEAR || FLO || align=right | 1.00 km || 
|-id=000 bgcolor=#fefefe
| 147000 ||  || — || August 14, 2002 || Socorro || LINEAR || FLO || align=right | 1.1 km || 
|}

References

External links 
 Discovery Circumstances: Numbered Minor Planets (145001)–(150000) (IAU Minor Planet Center)

0146